

264001–264100 

|-bgcolor=#d6d6d6
| 264001 ||  || — || July 21, 2009 || Hibiscus || N. Teamo || HYG || align=right | 3.7 km || 
|-id=002 bgcolor=#fefefe
| 264002 ||  || — || July 27, 2009 || La Sagra || OAM Obs. || — || align=right | 1.1 km || 
|-id=003 bgcolor=#d6d6d6
| 264003 ||  || — || July 28, 2009 || La Sagra || OAM Obs. || — || align=right | 4.3 km || 
|-id=004 bgcolor=#d6d6d6
| 264004 ||  || — || July 26, 2009 || Siding Spring || SSS || — || align=right | 4.2 km || 
|-id=005 bgcolor=#E9E9E9
| 264005 ||  || — || July 28, 2009 || Catalina || CSS || — || align=right | 3.3 km || 
|-id=006 bgcolor=#d6d6d6
| 264006 ||  || — || July 28, 2009 || Sierra Stars || R. Matson || HYG || align=right | 3.3 km || 
|-id=007 bgcolor=#fefefe
| 264007 ||  || — || July 28, 2009 || Kitt Peak || Spacewatch || — || align=right | 1.2 km || 
|-id=008 bgcolor=#d6d6d6
| 264008 ||  || — || July 28, 2009 || Kitt Peak || Spacewatch || 3:2 || align=right | 5.4 km || 
|-id=009 bgcolor=#d6d6d6
| 264009 ||  || — || July 19, 2009 || Siding Spring || SSS || — || align=right | 5.7 km || 
|-id=010 bgcolor=#E9E9E9
| 264010 ||  || — || August 15, 2009 || Mayhill || A. Lowe || MAR || align=right | 1.7 km || 
|-id=011 bgcolor=#fefefe
| 264011 ||  || — || August 13, 2009 || La Sagra || OAM Obs. || NYS || align=right | 1.1 km || 
|-id=012 bgcolor=#fefefe
| 264012 ||  || — || August 15, 2009 || La Sagra || OAM Obs. || NYS || align=right | 1.0 km || 
|-id=013 bgcolor=#d6d6d6
| 264013 ||  || — || August 10, 2009 || Kitt Peak || Spacewatch || — || align=right | 3.8 km || 
|-id=014 bgcolor=#fefefe
| 264014 ||  || — || August 15, 2009 || Kitt Peak || Spacewatch || — || align=right | 1.5 km || 
|-id=015 bgcolor=#d6d6d6
| 264015 ||  || — || August 15, 2009 || Kitt Peak || Spacewatch || — || align=right | 4.8 km || 
|-id=016 bgcolor=#E9E9E9
| 264016 ||  || — || August 14, 2009 || La Sagra || OAM Obs. || — || align=right | 1.3 km || 
|-id=017 bgcolor=#E9E9E9
| 264017 ||  || — || August 15, 2009 || Kitt Peak || Spacewatch || — || align=right | 3.4 km || 
|-id=018 bgcolor=#d6d6d6
| 264018 ||  || — || August 15, 2009 || Kitt Peak || Spacewatch || — || align=right | 2.9 km || 
|-id=019 bgcolor=#d6d6d6
| 264019 ||  || — || August 2, 2009 || Kitt Peak || Spacewatch || — || align=right | 5.5 km || 
|-id=020 bgcolor=#fefefe
| 264020 Stuttgart ||  ||  || August 17, 2009 || Tzec Maun || E. Schwab || — || align=right | 1.4 km || 
|-id=021 bgcolor=#d6d6d6
| 264021 ||  || — || August 17, 2009 || Vicques || M. Ory || 7:4 || align=right | 4.7 km || 
|-id=022 bgcolor=#d6d6d6
| 264022 ||  || — || August 16, 2009 || Črni Vrh || Črni Vrh || — || align=right | 5.4 km || 
|-id=023 bgcolor=#d6d6d6
| 264023 ||  || — || August 19, 2009 || Bergisch Gladbach || W. Bickel || — || align=right | 3.9 km || 
|-id=024 bgcolor=#d6d6d6
| 264024 ||  || — || October 8, 2004 || Kitt Peak || Spacewatch || VER || align=right | 3.8 km || 
|-id=025 bgcolor=#fefefe
| 264025 ||  || — || August 21, 2009 || Skylive Obs. || F. Tozzi || FLO || align=right data-sort-value="0.92" | 920 m || 
|-id=026 bgcolor=#d6d6d6
| 264026 ||  || — || August 22, 2009 || Sandlot || G. Hug || KOR || align=right | 1.9 km || 
|-id=027 bgcolor=#d6d6d6
| 264027 ||  || — || August 16, 2009 || Kitt Peak || Spacewatch || 3:2 || align=right | 5.4 km || 
|-id=028 bgcolor=#d6d6d6
| 264028 ||  || — || August 16, 2009 || Kitt Peak || Spacewatch || — || align=right | 5.3 km || 
|-id=029 bgcolor=#d6d6d6
| 264029 ||  || — || August 20, 2009 || La Sagra || OAM Obs. || 3:2 || align=right | 4.4 km || 
|-id=030 bgcolor=#d6d6d6
| 264030 ||  || — || August 18, 2009 || La Sagra || OAM Obs. || 3:2 || align=right | 4.4 km || 
|-id=031 bgcolor=#d6d6d6
| 264031 ||  || — || August 23, 2009 || La Sagra || OAM Obs. || ALA || align=right | 4.2 km || 
|-id=032 bgcolor=#d6d6d6
| 264032 ||  || — || August 23, 2009 || La Sagra || OAM Obs. || HYG || align=right | 3.8 km || 
|-id=033 bgcolor=#E9E9E9
| 264033 Boris-Mikhail ||  ||  || August 26, 2009 || Plana || F. Fratev || WIT || align=right | 1.2 km || 
|-id=034 bgcolor=#d6d6d6
| 264034 ||  || — || August 24, 2009 || Črni Vrh || Črni Vrh || HIL3:2 || align=right | 7.0 km || 
|-id=035 bgcolor=#fefefe
| 264035 ||  || — || August 26, 2009 || Catalina || CSS || — || align=right data-sort-value="0.92" | 920 m || 
|-id=036 bgcolor=#E9E9E9
| 264036 ||  || — || August 22, 2009 || Tiki || N. Teamo || AGN || align=right | 1.2 km || 
|-id=037 bgcolor=#d6d6d6
| 264037 ||  || — || August 19, 2009 || La Sagra || OAM Obs. || EOS || align=right | 3.1 km || 
|-id=038 bgcolor=#d6d6d6
| 264038 ||  || — || August 27, 2009 || Kitt Peak || Spacewatch || KAR || align=right | 1.4 km || 
|-id=039 bgcolor=#fefefe
| 264039 ||  || — || August 18, 2009 || Kitt Peak || Spacewatch || — || align=right | 1.1 km || 
|-id=040 bgcolor=#d6d6d6
| 264040 ||  || — || August 17, 2009 || Kitt Peak || Spacewatch || — || align=right | 3.3 km || 
|-id=041 bgcolor=#E9E9E9
| 264041 ||  || — || September 10, 2009 || La Sagra || OAM Obs. || — || align=right | 2.2 km || 
|-id=042 bgcolor=#fefefe
| 264042 ||  || — || September 14, 2009 || Mayhill || A. Lowe || FLO || align=right data-sort-value="0.80" | 800 m || 
|-id=043 bgcolor=#d6d6d6
| 264043 ||  || — || September 10, 2009 || Catalina || CSS || — || align=right | 3.1 km || 
|-id=044 bgcolor=#d6d6d6
| 264044 ||  || — || September 14, 2009 || Catalina || CSS || — || align=right | 5.2 km || 
|-id=045 bgcolor=#d6d6d6
| 264045 Heinerklinkrad ||  ||  || September 13, 2009 || ESA OGS || M. Busch, R. Kresken || — || align=right | 3.5 km || 
|-id=046 bgcolor=#E9E9E9
| 264046 ||  || — || September 14, 2009 || Kitt Peak || Spacewatch || — || align=right | 1.8 km || 
|-id=047 bgcolor=#E9E9E9
| 264047 ||  || — || September 14, 2009 || Kitt Peak || Spacewatch || — || align=right | 2.3 km || 
|-id=048 bgcolor=#C2FFFF
| 264048 ||  || — || September 14, 2009 || Kitt Peak || Spacewatch || L4ARK || align=right | 15 km || 
|-id=049 bgcolor=#d6d6d6
| 264049 ||  || — || September 15, 2009 || Kitt Peak || Spacewatch || — || align=right | 5.0 km || 
|-id=050 bgcolor=#C2FFFF
| 264050 ||  || — || September 15, 2009 || Kitt Peak || Spacewatch || L4 || align=right | 11 km || 
|-id=051 bgcolor=#C2FFFF
| 264051 ||  || — || September 15, 2009 || Kitt Peak || Spacewatch || L4 || align=right | 9.2 km || 
|-id=052 bgcolor=#E9E9E9
| 264052 ||  || — || September 15, 2009 || LightBuckets || LightBuckets Obs. || NEM || align=right | 3.2 km || 
|-id=053 bgcolor=#C2FFFF
| 264053 ||  || — || September 12, 2009 || Kitt Peak || Spacewatch || L4 || align=right | 8.0 km || 
|-id=054 bgcolor=#d6d6d6
| 264054 ||  || — || September 12, 2009 || Kitt Peak || Spacewatch || HYG || align=right | 3.0 km || 
|-id=055 bgcolor=#C2FFFF
| 264055 ||  || — || September 16, 2009 || Kitt Peak || Spacewatch || L4ERY || align=right | 8.9 km || 
|-id=056 bgcolor=#fefefe
| 264056 ||  || — || September 19, 2009 || Altschwendt || W. Ries || V || align=right | 1.0 km || 
|-id=057 bgcolor=#C2FFFF
| 264057 ||  || — || September 16, 2009 || Kitt Peak || Spacewatch || L4 || align=right | 7.1 km || 
|-id=058 bgcolor=#E9E9E9
| 264058 ||  || — || September 16, 2009 || Mount Lemmon || Mount Lemmon Survey || HOF || align=right | 3.2 km || 
|-id=059 bgcolor=#C2FFFF
| 264059 ||  || — || September 16, 2009 || Kitt Peak || Spacewatch || L4 || align=right | 12 km || 
|-id=060 bgcolor=#C2FFFF
| 264060 ||  || — || September 17, 2009 || Kitt Peak || Spacewatch || L4 || align=right | 11 km || 
|-id=061 bgcolor=#d6d6d6
| 264061 Vitebsk ||  ||  || September 23, 2009 || Tzec Maun || V. Nevski || 7:4 || align=right | 4.6 km || 
|-id=062 bgcolor=#d6d6d6
| 264062 ||  || — || September 23, 2009 || Dauban || F. Kugel || — || align=right | 3.9 km || 
|-id=063 bgcolor=#d6d6d6
| 264063 ||  || — || September 16, 2009 || Mount Lemmon || Mount Lemmon Survey || HYG || align=right | 3.3 km || 
|-id=064 bgcolor=#fefefe
| 264064 ||  || — || September 18, 2009 || Kitt Peak || Spacewatch || — || align=right | 1.1 km || 
|-id=065 bgcolor=#C2FFFF
| 264065 ||  || — || September 18, 2009 || Kitt Peak || Spacewatch || L4 || align=right | 13 km || 
|-id=066 bgcolor=#C2FFFF
| 264066 ||  || — || September 18, 2009 || Kitt Peak || Spacewatch || L4 || align=right | 11 km || 
|-id=067 bgcolor=#d6d6d6
| 264067 ||  || — || September 19, 2009 || Kitt Peak || Spacewatch || THM || align=right | 2.2 km || 
|-id=068 bgcolor=#C2FFFF
| 264068 ||  || — || September 19, 2009 || Moletai || K. Černis, J. Zdanavičius || L4 || align=right | 11 km || 
|-id=069 bgcolor=#E9E9E9
| 264069 ||  || — || September 20, 2009 || Kitt Peak || Spacewatch || HOF || align=right | 2.8 km || 
|-id=070 bgcolor=#d6d6d6
| 264070 ||  || — || September 20, 2009 || Kitt Peak || Spacewatch || — || align=right | 3.3 km || 
|-id=071 bgcolor=#C2FFFF
| 264071 ||  || — || September 20, 2009 || Kitt Peak || Spacewatch || L4ERY || align=right | 9.3 km || 
|-id=072 bgcolor=#d6d6d6
| 264072 ||  || — || September 26, 2009 || Wildberg || R. Apitzsch || NAE || align=right | 3.3 km || 
|-id=073 bgcolor=#C2FFFF
| 264073 ||  || — || September 21, 2009 || Kitt Peak || Spacewatch || L4 || align=right | 9.0 km || 
|-id=074 bgcolor=#C2FFFF
| 264074 ||  || — || September 21, 2009 || Kitt Peak || Spacewatch || L4 || align=right | 13 km || 
|-id=075 bgcolor=#C2FFFF
| 264075 ||  || — || September 21, 2009 || Kitt Peak || Spacewatch || L4 || align=right | 12 km || 
|-id=076 bgcolor=#C2FFFF
| 264076 ||  || — || September 22, 2009 || Kitt Peak || Spacewatch || L4 || align=right | 11 km || 
|-id=077 bgcolor=#E9E9E9
| 264077 Dluzhnevskaya ||  ||  || September 24, 2009 || Zelenchukskaya || T. V. Kryachko || — || align=right | 2.7 km || 
|-id=078 bgcolor=#fefefe
| 264078 ||  || — || September 24, 2009 || Kitt Peak || Spacewatch || FLO || align=right data-sort-value="0.81" | 810 m || 
|-id=079 bgcolor=#E9E9E9
| 264079 ||  || — || September 16, 2009 || Catalina || CSS || — || align=right | 3.5 km || 
|-id=080 bgcolor=#E9E9E9
| 264080 ||  || — || September 16, 2009 || Catalina || CSS || CLO || align=right | 2.2 km || 
|-id=081 bgcolor=#d6d6d6
| 264081 ||  || — || September 16, 2009 || Catalina || CSS || — || align=right | 4.4 km || 
|-id=082 bgcolor=#E9E9E9
| 264082 ||  || — || September 18, 2009 || Catalina || CSS || MAR || align=right | 1.6 km || 
|-id=083 bgcolor=#C2FFFF
| 264083 ||  || — || September 17, 2009 || Kitt Peak || Spacewatch || L4 || align=right | 6.5 km || 
|-id=084 bgcolor=#C2FFFF
| 264084 ||  || — || September 17, 2009 || Kitt Peak || Spacewatch || L4 || align=right | 8.2 km || 
|-id=085 bgcolor=#C2FFFF
| 264085 ||  || — || September 18, 2009 || Kitt Peak || Spacewatch || L4 || align=right | 7.6 km || 
|-id=086 bgcolor=#C2FFFF
| 264086 ||  || — || September 18, 2009 || Kitt Peak || Spacewatch || L4 || align=right | 9.4 km || 
|-id=087 bgcolor=#C2FFFF
| 264087 ||  || — || September 21, 2009 || Kitt Peak || Spacewatch || L4 || align=right | 10 km || 
|-id=088 bgcolor=#E9E9E9
| 264088 ||  || — || September 16, 2009 || Siding Spring || SSS || — || align=right | 2.6 km || 
|-id=089 bgcolor=#C2FFFF
| 264089 ||  || — || September 21, 2009 || Mount Lemmon || Mount Lemmon Survey || L4 || align=right | 11 km || 
|-id=090 bgcolor=#E9E9E9
| 264090 ||  || — || September 25, 2009 || Kitt Peak || Spacewatch || NEM || align=right | 2.4 km || 
|-id=091 bgcolor=#fefefe
| 264091 ||  || — || September 25, 2009 || Kitt Peak || Spacewatch || — || align=right | 1.3 km || 
|-id=092 bgcolor=#d6d6d6
| 264092 ||  || — || September 25, 2009 || Catalina || CSS || — || align=right | 4.2 km || 
|-id=093 bgcolor=#d6d6d6
| 264093 ||  || — || September 25, 2009 || Kitt Peak || Spacewatch || — || align=right | 4.1 km || 
|-id=094 bgcolor=#C2FFFF
| 264094 ||  || — || September 25, 2009 || Kitt Peak || Spacewatch || L4 || align=right | 10 km || 
|-id=095 bgcolor=#d6d6d6
| 264095 ||  || — || September 25, 2009 || Catalina || CSS || THM || align=right | 2.7 km || 
|-id=096 bgcolor=#E9E9E9
| 264096 ||  || — || September 26, 2009 || Kitt Peak || Spacewatch || — || align=right | 1.9 km || 
|-id=097 bgcolor=#d6d6d6
| 264097 ||  || — || September 27, 2009 || Kitt Peak || Spacewatch || — || align=right | 3.3 km || 
|-id=098 bgcolor=#E9E9E9
| 264098 ||  || — || September 28, 2009 || Catalina || CSS || — || align=right | 1.6 km || 
|-id=099 bgcolor=#E9E9E9
| 264099 ||  || — || September 17, 2009 || Kitt Peak || Spacewatch || — || align=right | 2.3 km || 
|-id=100 bgcolor=#C2FFFF
| 264100 ||  || — || September 16, 2009 || Kitt Peak || Spacewatch || L4 || align=right | 8.7 km || 
|}

264101–264200 

|-bgcolor=#C2FFFF
| 264101 ||  || — || September 16, 2009 || Kitt Peak || Spacewatch || L4ERY || align=right | 10 km || 
|-id=102 bgcolor=#d6d6d6
| 264102 ||  || — || October 3, 2003 || Kitt Peak || Spacewatch || 7:4 || align=right | 4.6 km || 
|-id=103 bgcolor=#C2FFFF
| 264103 ||  || — || September 17, 2009 || Kitt Peak || Spacewatch || L4 || align=right | 8.7 km || 
|-id=104 bgcolor=#d6d6d6
| 264104 ||  || — || September 18, 2009 || Kitt Peak || Spacewatch || 7:4 || align=right | 3.6 km || 
|-id=105 bgcolor=#E9E9E9
| 264105 ||  || — || September 16, 2009 || Mount Lemmon || Mount Lemmon Survey || — || align=right | 3.0 km || 
|-id=106 bgcolor=#d6d6d6
| 264106 ||  || — || September 19, 2009 || Catalina || CSS || HYG || align=right | 4.0 km || 
|-id=107 bgcolor=#d6d6d6
| 264107 ||  || — || September 28, 2009 || Catalina || CSS || — || align=right | 2.8 km || 
|-id=108 bgcolor=#d6d6d6
| 264108 ||  || — || September 24, 2009 || Hibiscus || N. Teamo || — || align=right | 4.1 km || 
|-id=109 bgcolor=#C2FFFF
| 264109 ||  || — || September 22, 2009 || La Sagra || OAM Obs. || L4 || align=right | 13 km || 
|-id=110 bgcolor=#C2FFFF
| 264110 ||  || — || September 23, 2009 || Mount Lemmon || Mount Lemmon Survey || L4ARK || align=right | 13 km || 
|-id=111 bgcolor=#d6d6d6
| 264111 ||  || — || September 22, 2009 || Kitt Peak || Spacewatch || — || align=right | 3.8 km || 
|-id=112 bgcolor=#E9E9E9
| 264112 ||  || — || September 22, 2009 || Kitt Peak || Spacewatch || — || align=right | 2.6 km || 
|-id=113 bgcolor=#d6d6d6
| 264113 ||  || — || September 28, 2009 || Mount Lemmon || Mount Lemmon Survey || — || align=right | 3.2 km || 
|-id=114 bgcolor=#C2FFFF
| 264114 ||  || — || September 26, 2009 || Kitt Peak || Spacewatch || L4 || align=right | 8.7 km || 
|-id=115 bgcolor=#d6d6d6
| 264115 ||  || — || September 17, 2009 || Kitt Peak || Spacewatch || 3:2 || align=right | 5.8 km || 
|-id=116 bgcolor=#C2FFFF
| 264116 ||  || — || September 27, 2009 || Kitt Peak || Spacewatch || L4 || align=right | 8.5 km || 
|-id=117 bgcolor=#d6d6d6
| 264117 ||  || — || September 22, 2009 || Mount Lemmon || Mount Lemmon Survey || — || align=right | 3.0 km || 
|-id=118 bgcolor=#E9E9E9
| 264118 ||  || — || September 26, 2009 || Kitt Peak || Spacewatch || — || align=right | 2.7 km || 
|-id=119 bgcolor=#C2FFFF
| 264119 Georgeorton ||  ||  || October 13, 2009 || Mayhill || A. Lowe || L4 || align=right | 14 km || 
|-id=120 bgcolor=#C2FFFF
| 264120 ||  || — || October 14, 2009 || Nazaret || G. Muler || L4 || align=right | 12 km || 
|-id=121 bgcolor=#C2FFFF
| 264121 ||  || — || October 2, 2009 || Mount Lemmon || Mount Lemmon Survey || L4 || align=right | 11 km || 
|-id=122 bgcolor=#d6d6d6
| 264122 ||  || — || October 12, 2009 || La Sagra || OAM Obs. || — || align=right | 4.2 km || 
|-id=123 bgcolor=#C2FFFF
| 264123 ||  || — || September 18, 2009 || Catalina || CSS || L4 || align=right | 16 km || 
|-id=124 bgcolor=#d6d6d6
| 264124 ||  || — || October 9, 2009 || Catalina || CSS || — || align=right | 3.9 km || 
|-id=125 bgcolor=#C2FFFF
| 264125 ||  || — || October 14, 2009 || La Sagra || OAM Obs. || L4ERY || align=right | 15 km || 
|-id=126 bgcolor=#d6d6d6
| 264126 ||  || — || October 15, 2009 || Catalina || CSS || EOS || align=right | 2.9 km || 
|-id=127 bgcolor=#d6d6d6
| 264127 ||  || — || October 12, 2009 || La Sagra || OAM Obs. || — || align=right | 3.7 km || 
|-id=128 bgcolor=#d6d6d6
| 264128 ||  || — || October 15, 2009 || Catalina || CSS || — || align=right | 4.5 km || 
|-id=129 bgcolor=#d6d6d6
| 264129 ||  || — || October 15, 2009 || Catalina || CSS || EOS || align=right | 3.4 km || 
|-id=130 bgcolor=#C2FFFF
| 264130 ||  || — || October 1, 2009 || Mount Lemmon || Mount Lemmon Survey || L4 || align=right | 17 km || 
|-id=131 bgcolor=#fefefe
| 264131 Bornim ||  ||  || October 19, 2009 || Inastars || B. Thinius || — || align=right | 1.1 km || 
|-id=132 bgcolor=#C2FFFF
| 264132 ||  || — || October 17, 2009 || La Sagra || OAM Obs. || L4 || align=right | 11 km || 
|-id=133 bgcolor=#C2FFFF
| 264133 ||  || — || October 17, 2009 || La Cañada || J. Lacruz || L4 || align=right | 12 km || 
|-id=134 bgcolor=#C2FFFF
| 264134 ||  || — || October 16, 2009 || Catalina || CSS || L4 || align=right | 14 km || 
|-id=135 bgcolor=#C2FFFF
| 264135 ||  || — || October 22, 2009 || Catalina || CSS || L4 || align=right | 13 km || 
|-id=136 bgcolor=#E9E9E9
| 264136 ||  || — || October 17, 2009 || Mount Lemmon || Mount Lemmon Survey || HEN || align=right | 1.4 km || 
|-id=137 bgcolor=#E9E9E9
| 264137 ||  || — || October 22, 2009 || Catalina || CSS || — || align=right | 1.3 km || 
|-id=138 bgcolor=#C2FFFF
| 264138 ||  || — || October 21, 2009 || Mount Lemmon || Mount Lemmon Survey || L4 || align=right | 9.9 km || 
|-id=139 bgcolor=#C2FFFF
| 264139 ||  || — || October 21, 2009 || Mount Lemmon || Mount Lemmon Survey || L4ERY || align=right | 14 km || 
|-id=140 bgcolor=#d6d6d6
| 264140 ||  || — || October 24, 2009 || Catalina || CSS || KOR || align=right | 2.0 km || 
|-id=141 bgcolor=#C2FFFF
| 264141 ||  || — || October 24, 2009 || Catalina || CSS || L4 || align=right | 14 km || 
|-id=142 bgcolor=#d6d6d6
| 264142 ||  || — || October 22, 2009 || Catalina || CSS || — || align=right | 5.9 km || 
|-id=143 bgcolor=#E9E9E9
| 264143 ||  || — || October 16, 2009 || Catalina || CSS || — || align=right | 3.9 km || 
|-id=144 bgcolor=#C2FFFF
| 264144 ||  || — || October 18, 2009 || La Sagra || OAM Obs. || L4 || align=right | 14 km || 
|-id=145 bgcolor=#C2FFFF
| 264145 ||  || — || October 23, 2009 || Mount Lemmon || Mount Lemmon Survey || L4 || align=right | 12 km || 
|-id=146 bgcolor=#d6d6d6
| 264146 ||  || — || October 23, 2009 || Mount Lemmon || Mount Lemmon Survey || — || align=right | 3.4 km || 
|-id=147 bgcolor=#C2FFFF
| 264147 ||  || — || October 16, 2009 || Catalina || CSS || L4 || align=right | 10 km || 
|-id=148 bgcolor=#d6d6d6
| 264148 ||  || — || October 27, 2009 || Catalina || CSS || — || align=right | 5.0 km || 
|-id=149 bgcolor=#d6d6d6
| 264149 ||  || — || October 26, 2009 || Catalina || CSS || EMA || align=right | 5.4 km || 
|-id=150 bgcolor=#C2FFFF
| 264150 Dolops ||  ||  || November 10, 2009 || Zelenchukskaya || T. V. Kryachko || L4 || align=right | 9.5 km || 
|-id=151 bgcolor=#d6d6d6
| 264151 ||  || — || November 14, 2009 || La Sagra || OAM Obs. || — || align=right | 3.2 km || 
|-id=152 bgcolor=#d6d6d6
| 264152 ||  || — || November 9, 2009 || Catalina || CSS || — || align=right | 3.8 km || 
|-id=153 bgcolor=#C2FFFF
| 264153 ||  || — || November 11, 2009 || Catalina || CSS || L4 || align=right | 15 km || 
|-id=154 bgcolor=#C2FFFF
| 264154 ||  || — || November 8, 2009 || Catalina || CSS || L4 || align=right | 18 km || 
|-id=155 bgcolor=#C2FFFF
| 264155 ||  || — || November 9, 2009 || Mount Lemmon || Mount Lemmon Survey || L4 || align=right | 17 km || 
|-id=156 bgcolor=#C2FFFF
| 264156 ||  || — || November 17, 2009 || Tzec Maun || D. Chestnov, A. Novichonok || L4ERY || align=right | 15 km || 
|-id=157 bgcolor=#C2FFFF
| 264157 ||  || — || December 18, 2009 || Mount Lemmon || Mount Lemmon Survey || L4 || align=right | 15 km || 
|-id=158 bgcolor=#d6d6d6
| 264158 ||  || — || January 6, 2010 || Kitt Peak || Spacewatch || — || align=right | 2.9 km || 
|-id=159 bgcolor=#fefefe
| 264159 ||  || — || January 8, 2010 || Kitt Peak || Spacewatch || — || align=right | 1.3 km || 
|-id=160 bgcolor=#d6d6d6
| 264160 ||  || — || January 6, 2010 || Kitt Peak || Spacewatch || — || align=right | 3.3 km || 
|-id=161 bgcolor=#d6d6d6
| 264161 ||  || — || January 12, 2010 || WISE || WISE || NAE || align=right | 3.9 km || 
|-id=162 bgcolor=#d6d6d6
| 264162 ||  || — || January 12, 2010 || WISE || WISE || 7:4 || align=right | 5.4 km || 
|-id=163 bgcolor=#d6d6d6
| 264163 ||  || — || January 12, 2010 || WISE || WISE || — || align=right | 4.1 km || 
|-id=164 bgcolor=#C2FFFF
| 264164 ||  || — || January 12, 2010 || WISE || WISE || L4ERY || align=right | 11 km || 
|-id=165 bgcolor=#d6d6d6
| 264165 Poehler ||  ||  || January 14, 2010 || WISE || WISE || — || align=right | 5.5 km || 
|-id=166 bgcolor=#C2FFFF
| 264166 ||  || — || December 7, 1999 || Kitt Peak || Spacewatch || L4ERY || align=right | 16 km || 
|-id=167 bgcolor=#d6d6d6
| 264167 ||  || — || January 21, 2010 || WISE || WISE || — || align=right | 4.1 km || 
|-id=168 bgcolor=#d6d6d6
| 264168 ||  || — || February 14, 2010 || Desert Moon || B. L. Stevens || — || align=right | 2.9 km || 
|-id=169 bgcolor=#E9E9E9
| 264169 ||  || — || February 12, 2010 || Socorro || LINEAR || — || align=right | 3.4 km || 
|-id=170 bgcolor=#E9E9E9
| 264170 ||  || — || February 13, 2010 || Kitt Peak || Spacewatch || — || align=right | 2.6 km || 
|-id=171 bgcolor=#d6d6d6
| 264171 ||  || — || February 14, 2010 || Mount Lemmon || Mount Lemmon Survey || KOR || align=right | 1.6 km || 
|-id=172 bgcolor=#fefefe
| 264172 ||  || — || February 15, 2010 || Kitt Peak || Spacewatch || NYS || align=right data-sort-value="0.70" | 700 m || 
|-id=173 bgcolor=#E9E9E9
| 264173 ||  || — || February 15, 2010 || Mount Lemmon || Mount Lemmon Survey || HOF || align=right | 2.9 km || 
|-id=174 bgcolor=#d6d6d6
| 264174 ||  || — || February 14, 2010 || Kitt Peak || Spacewatch || — || align=right | 3.1 km || 
|-id=175 bgcolor=#E9E9E9
| 264175 ||  || — || February 17, 2010 || WISE || WISE || — || align=right | 3.3 km || 
|-id=176 bgcolor=#fefefe
| 264176 ||  || — || February 16, 2010 || Kitt Peak || Spacewatch || NYS || align=right data-sort-value="0.67" | 670 m || 
|-id=177 bgcolor=#fefefe
| 264177 ||  || — || February 17, 2010 || Kitt Peak || Spacewatch || V || align=right data-sort-value="0.68" | 680 m || 
|-id=178 bgcolor=#fefefe
| 264178 ||  || — || March 5, 2010 || Catalina || CSS || — || align=right | 1.2 km || 
|-id=179 bgcolor=#d6d6d6
| 264179 ||  || — || March 12, 2010 || Mount Lemmon || Mount Lemmon Survey || — || align=right | 3.1 km || 
|-id=180 bgcolor=#E9E9E9
| 264180 ||  || — || March 12, 2010 || Mount Lemmon || Mount Lemmon Survey || — || align=right | 1.8 km || 
|-id=181 bgcolor=#d6d6d6
| 264181 ||  || — || March 13, 2010 || WISE || WISE || — || align=right | 5.1 km || 
|-id=182 bgcolor=#d6d6d6
| 264182 ||  || — || March 12, 2010 || Kitt Peak || Spacewatch || KOR || align=right | 1.8 km || 
|-id=183 bgcolor=#d6d6d6
| 264183 ||  || — || March 12, 2010 || Catalina || CSS || HYG || align=right | 3.5 km || 
|-id=184 bgcolor=#d6d6d6
| 264184 ||  || — || March 13, 2010 || Kitt Peak || Spacewatch || 7:4 || align=right | 6.1 km || 
|-id=185 bgcolor=#d6d6d6
| 264185 ||  || — || March 15, 2010 || Catalina || CSS || — || align=right | 5.8 km || 
|-id=186 bgcolor=#d6d6d6
| 264186 ||  || — || March 13, 2010 || Kitt Peak || Spacewatch || — || align=right | 3.7 km || 
|-id=187 bgcolor=#E9E9E9
| 264187 ||  || — || March 16, 2010 || Kitt Peak || Spacewatch || — || align=right | 2.0 km || 
|-id=188 bgcolor=#d6d6d6
| 264188 ||  || — || March 18, 2010 || Kitt Peak || Spacewatch || KOR || align=right | 1.4 km || 
|-id=189 bgcolor=#d6d6d6
| 264189 ||  || — || March 16, 2010 || Mount Lemmon || Mount Lemmon Survey || — || align=right | 3.1 km || 
|-id=190 bgcolor=#d6d6d6
| 264190 ||  || — || March 18, 2010 || Mount Lemmon || Mount Lemmon Survey || 7:4 || align=right | 6.0 km || 
|-id=191 bgcolor=#d6d6d6
| 264191 ||  || — || April 5, 2010 || Kitt Peak || Spacewatch || — || align=right | 3.9 km || 
|-id=192 bgcolor=#E9E9E9
| 264192 ||  || — || April 8, 2010 || Kitt Peak || Spacewatch || — || align=right | 2.8 km || 
|-id=193 bgcolor=#E9E9E9
| 264193 ||  || — || April 8, 2010 || Kitt Peak || Spacewatch || — || align=right | 1.3 km || 
|-id=194 bgcolor=#E9E9E9
| 264194 ||  || — || April 8, 2010 || Mount Lemmon || Mount Lemmon Survey || — || align=right | 1.2 km || 
|-id=195 bgcolor=#E9E9E9
| 264195 ||  || — || April 26, 2010 || WISE || WISE || NEM || align=right | 2.8 km || 
|-id=196 bgcolor=#d6d6d6
| 264196 ||  || — || May 5, 2010 || Nogales || Tenagra II Obs. || — || align=right | 5.4 km || 
|-id=197 bgcolor=#E9E9E9
| 264197 ||  || — || May 7, 2010 || Mount Lemmon || Mount Lemmon Survey || EUN || align=right | 1.9 km || 
|-id=198 bgcolor=#E9E9E9
| 264198 ||  || — || May 7, 2010 || Catalina || CSS || — || align=right | 1.6 km || 
|-id=199 bgcolor=#fefefe
| 264199 ||  || — || June 8, 2010 || WISE || WISE || ERI || align=right | 2.3 km || 
|-id=200 bgcolor=#d6d6d6
| 264200 ||  || — || October 20, 1995 || Kitt Peak || Spacewatch || NAE || align=right | 3.3 km || 
|}

264201–264300 

|-bgcolor=#d6d6d6
| 264201 ||  || — || July 4, 2010 || WISE || WISE || LIX || align=right | 3.9 km || 
|-id=202 bgcolor=#d6d6d6
| 264202 ||  || — || October 19, 1999 || Socorro || LINEAR || — || align=right | 4.8 km || 
|-id=203 bgcolor=#d6d6d6
| 264203 ||  || — || October 22, 2005 || Kitt Peak || Spacewatch || — || align=right | 4.4 km || 
|-id=204 bgcolor=#fefefe
| 264204 ||  || — || November 1, 2000 || Socorro || LINEAR || — || align=right | 1.6 km || 
|-id=205 bgcolor=#fefefe
| 264205 ||  || — || February 4, 2000 || Socorro || LINEAR || — || align=right | 2.7 km || 
|-id=206 bgcolor=#E9E9E9
| 264206 ||  || — || May 28, 2000 || Kitt Peak || Spacewatch || — || align=right | 3.2 km || 
|-id=207 bgcolor=#d6d6d6
| 264207 ||  || — || November 3, 1999 || Socorro || LINEAR || EUP || align=right | 5.0 km || 
|-id=208 bgcolor=#d6d6d6
| 264208 ||  || — || August 21, 2004 || Siding Spring || SSS || — || align=right | 4.0 km || 
|-id=209 bgcolor=#E9E9E9
| 264209 ||  || — || April 30, 2005 || Kitt Peak || Spacewatch || — || align=right | 1.4 km || 
|-id=210 bgcolor=#d6d6d6
| 264210 ||  || — || October 11, 2004 || Kitt Peak || Spacewatch || EUP || align=right | 4.6 km || 
|-id=211 bgcolor=#d6d6d6
| 264211 ||  || — || September 30, 2003 || Kitt Peak || Spacewatch || 7:4 || align=right | 6.2 km || 
|-id=212 bgcolor=#E9E9E9
| 264212 ||  || — || July 4, 2005 || Kitt Peak || Spacewatch || ADE || align=right | 3.5 km || 
|-id=213 bgcolor=#fefefe
| 264213 ||  || — || October 13, 1999 || Socorro || LINEAR || — || align=right | 1.1 km || 
|-id=214 bgcolor=#E9E9E9
| 264214 ||  || — || September 20, 2001 || Socorro || LINEAR || — || align=right | 1.6 km || 
|-id=215 bgcolor=#fefefe
| 264215 ||  || — || November 20, 2000 || Socorro || LINEAR || FLO || align=right data-sort-value="0.73" | 730 m || 
|-id=216 bgcolor=#fefefe
| 264216 ||  || — || February 11, 2004 || Palomar || NEAT || MAS || align=right data-sort-value="0.99" | 990 m || 
|-id=217 bgcolor=#fefefe
| 264217 ||  || — || February 14, 2004 || Kitt Peak || Spacewatch || MAS || align=right data-sort-value="0.89" | 890 m || 
|-id=218 bgcolor=#FA8072
| 264218 ||  || — || August 1, 2000 || Socorro || LINEAR || — || align=right data-sort-value="0.79" | 790 m || 
|-id=219 bgcolor=#fefefe
| 264219 ||  || — || May 6, 2006 || Mount Lemmon || Mount Lemmon Survey || FLO || align=right data-sort-value="0.67" | 670 m || 
|-id=220 bgcolor=#fefefe
| 264220 ||  || — || September 7, 1999 || Socorro || LINEAR || MAS || align=right data-sort-value="0.93" | 930 m || 
|-id=221 bgcolor=#d6d6d6
| 264221 ||  || — || July 31, 2000 || Cerro Tololo || M. W. Buie || — || align=right | 2.7 km || 
|-id=222 bgcolor=#fefefe
| 264222 ||  || — || January 17, 2004 || Kitt Peak || Spacewatch || NYS || align=right data-sort-value="0.79" | 790 m || 
|-id=223 bgcolor=#fefefe
| 264223 ||  || — || March 23, 2006 || Mount Lemmon || Mount Lemmon Survey || — || align=right data-sort-value="0.74" | 740 m || 
|-id=224 bgcolor=#fefefe
| 264224 ||  || — || March 4, 2005 || Catalina || CSS || V || align=right data-sort-value="0.73" | 730 m || 
|-id=225 bgcolor=#E9E9E9
| 264225 ||  || — || September 19, 2001 || Socorro || LINEAR || — || align=right | 2.0 km || 
|-id=226 bgcolor=#d6d6d6
| 264226 ||  || — || October 1, 2005 || Mount Lemmon || Mount Lemmon Survey || — || align=right | 3.2 km || 
|-id=227 bgcolor=#E9E9E9
| 264227 ||  || — || October 21, 2006 || Mount Lemmon || Mount Lemmon Survey || — || align=right | 1.6 km || 
|-id=228 bgcolor=#fefefe
| 264228 ||  || — || September 22, 2003 || Anderson Mesa || LONEOS || — || align=right data-sort-value="0.91" | 910 m || 
|-id=229 bgcolor=#fefefe
| 264229 ||  || — || October 1, 2003 || Kitt Peak || Spacewatch || — || align=right data-sort-value="0.86" | 860 m || 
|-id=230 bgcolor=#E9E9E9
| 264230 ||  || — || May 31, 2001 || Kitt Peak || Spacewatch || — || align=right | 1.2 km || 
|-id=231 bgcolor=#E9E9E9
| 264231 ||  || — || November 7, 2002 || Apache Point || SDSS || — || align=right | 2.0 km || 
|-id=232 bgcolor=#d6d6d6
| 264232 ||  || — || September 1, 2005 || Kitt Peak || Spacewatch || CHA || align=right | 2.4 km || 
|-id=233 bgcolor=#FA8072
| 264233 ||  || — || June 28, 1997 || Socorro || LINEAR || — || align=right | 1.1 km || 
|-id=234 bgcolor=#fefefe
| 264234 ||  || — || December 18, 2007 || Mount Lemmon || Mount Lemmon Survey || — || align=right data-sort-value="0.89" | 890 m || 
|-id=235 bgcolor=#d6d6d6
| 264235 ||  || — || January 16, 2001 || Haleakala || NEAT || — || align=right | 3.4 km || 
|-id=236 bgcolor=#fefefe
| 264236 ||  || — || May 19, 2002 || Palomar || NEAT || V || align=right data-sort-value="0.83" | 830 m || 
|-id=237 bgcolor=#E9E9E9
| 264237 ||  || — || October 17, 2001 || Socorro || LINEAR || — || align=right | 2.9 km || 
|-id=238 bgcolor=#d6d6d6
| 264238 ||  || — || July 29, 2000 || Cerro Tololo || M. W. Buie || KOR || align=right | 1.4 km || 
|-id=239 bgcolor=#E9E9E9
| 264239 ||  || — || March 15, 2004 || Kitt Peak || Spacewatch || — || align=right | 1.8 km || 
|-id=240 bgcolor=#d6d6d6
| 264240 ||  || — || April 15, 1997 || Kitt Peak || Spacewatch || EOS || align=right | 3.0 km || 
|-id=241 bgcolor=#E9E9E9
| 264241 ||  || — || November 10, 1993 || Kitt Peak || Spacewatch || — || align=right | 2.0 km || 
|-id=242 bgcolor=#FA8072
| 264242 ||  || — || October 28, 1997 || Kitt Peak || Spacewatch || — || align=right data-sort-value="0.88" | 880 m || 
|-id=243 bgcolor=#d6d6d6
| 264243 ||  || — || September 9, 2004 || Palomar || NEAT || — || align=right | 4.4 km || 
|-id=244 bgcolor=#fefefe
| 264244 ||  || — || March 17, 2005 || Kitt Peak || Spacewatch || V || align=right data-sort-value="0.80" | 800 m || 
|-id=245 bgcolor=#fefefe
| 264245 ||  || — || January 19, 2004 || Kitt Peak || Spacewatch || MAS || align=right data-sort-value="0.75" | 750 m || 
|-id=246 bgcolor=#E9E9E9
| 264246 ||  || — || March 20, 1999 || Apache Point || SDSS || — || align=right | 1.9 km || 
|-id=247 bgcolor=#d6d6d6
| 264247 ||  || — || September 11, 2004 || Kitt Peak || Spacewatch || THM || align=right | 2.8 km || 
|-id=248 bgcolor=#E9E9E9
| 264248 || 2176 P-L || — || September 24, 1960 || Palomar || PLS || — || align=right data-sort-value="0.97" | 970 m || 
|-id=249 bgcolor=#E9E9E9
| 264249 || 4539 P-L || — || September 24, 1960 || Palomar || PLS || RAF || align=right | 1.5 km || 
|-id=250 bgcolor=#E9E9E9
| 264250 || 1447 T-2 || — || September 29, 1973 || Palomar || PLS || — || align=right | 3.3 km || 
|-id=251 bgcolor=#fefefe
| 264251 || 3301 T-2 || — || September 30, 1973 || Palomar || PLS || — || align=right data-sort-value="0.84" | 840 m || 
|-id=252 bgcolor=#fefefe
| 264252 || 4205 T-2 || — || September 29, 1973 || Palomar || PLS || — || align=right data-sort-value="0.88" | 880 m || 
|-id=253 bgcolor=#E9E9E9
| 264253 || 1104 T-3 || — || October 17, 1977 || Palomar || PLS || DOR || align=right | 3.3 km || 
|-id=254 bgcolor=#fefefe
| 264254 || 2259 T-3 || — || October 16, 1977 || Palomar || PLS || FLO || align=right data-sort-value="0.79" | 790 m || 
|-id=255 bgcolor=#E9E9E9
| 264255 || 2323 T-3 || — || October 16, 1977 || Palomar || PLS || — || align=right | 1.8 km || 
|-id=256 bgcolor=#E9E9E9
| 264256 || 3031 T-3 || — || October 16, 1977 || Palomar || PLS || — || align=right | 1.5 km || 
|-id=257 bgcolor=#fefefe
| 264257 || 4114 T-3 || — || October 16, 1977 || Palomar || PLS || — || align=right | 1.3 km || 
|-id=258 bgcolor=#E9E9E9
| 264258 || 4232 T-3 || — || October 16, 1977 || Palomar || PLS || PAD || align=right | 2.3 km || 
|-id=259 bgcolor=#fefefe
| 264259 ||  || — || June 25, 1979 || Siding Spring || E. F. Helin, S. J. Bus || — || align=right | 1.1 km || 
|-id=260 bgcolor=#fefefe
| 264260 ||  || — || March 19, 1993 || La Silla || UESAC || NYS || align=right data-sort-value="0.87" | 870 m || 
|-id=261 bgcolor=#fefefe
| 264261 ||  || — || March 6, 1994 || Kitt Peak || Spacewatch || — || align=right data-sort-value="0.61" | 610 m || 
|-id=262 bgcolor=#fefefe
| 264262 ||  || — || August 10, 1994 || La Silla || E. W. Elst || NYS || align=right data-sort-value="0.91" | 910 m || 
|-id=263 bgcolor=#d6d6d6
| 264263 ||  || — || December 31, 1994 || Kitt Peak || Spacewatch || — || align=right | 4.2 km || 
|-id=264 bgcolor=#fefefe
| 264264 ||  || — || February 1, 1995 || Kitt Peak || Spacewatch || — || align=right data-sort-value="0.78" | 780 m || 
|-id=265 bgcolor=#d6d6d6
| 264265 ||  || — || April 1, 1995 || Kitt Peak || Spacewatch || HYG || align=right | 3.7 km || 
|-id=266 bgcolor=#fefefe
| 264266 ||  || — || April 25, 1995 || Kitt Peak || Spacewatch || — || align=right data-sort-value="0.89" | 890 m || 
|-id=267 bgcolor=#fefefe
| 264267 ||  || — || September 21, 1995 || Kitt Peak || Spacewatch || — || align=right | 1.0 km || 
|-id=268 bgcolor=#fefefe
| 264268 ||  || — || October 18, 1995 || Kitt Peak || Spacewatch || — || align=right data-sort-value="0.87" | 870 m || 
|-id=269 bgcolor=#E9E9E9
| 264269 ||  || — || October 23, 1995 || Kitt Peak || Spacewatch || PAD || align=right | 2.2 km || 
|-id=270 bgcolor=#fefefe
| 264270 ||  || — || October 20, 1995 || Kitt Peak || Spacewatch || NYS || align=right data-sort-value="0.58" | 580 m || 
|-id=271 bgcolor=#E9E9E9
| 264271 ||  || — || October 25, 1995 || Kitt Peak || Spacewatch || HOF || align=right | 3.3 km || 
|-id=272 bgcolor=#d6d6d6
| 264272 ||  || — || November 14, 1995 || Kitt Peak || Spacewatch || KOR || align=right | 1.6 km || 
|-id=273 bgcolor=#E9E9E9
| 264273 ||  || — || November 15, 1995 || Kitt Peak || Spacewatch || — || align=right | 2.2 km || 
|-id=274 bgcolor=#d6d6d6
| 264274 ||  || — || May 15, 1996 || Kitt Peak || Spacewatch || — || align=right | 4.3 km || 
|-id=275 bgcolor=#FA8072
| 264275 ||  || — || December 27, 1996 || Modra || Modra Obs. || — || align=right | 1.1 km || 
|-id=276 bgcolor=#d6d6d6
| 264276 ||  || — || June 8, 1997 || Kitt Peak || Spacewatch || EOS || align=right | 2.3 km || 
|-id=277 bgcolor=#E9E9E9
| 264277 ||  || — || July 5, 1997 || Kitt Peak || Spacewatch || JUN || align=right | 1.2 km || 
|-id=278 bgcolor=#d6d6d6
| 264278 ||  || — || September 28, 1997 || Kitt Peak || Spacewatch || EOS || align=right | 2.6 km || 
|-id=279 bgcolor=#E9E9E9
| 264279 ||  || — || September 30, 1997 || Kitt Peak || Spacewatch || — || align=right | 1.3 km || 
|-id=280 bgcolor=#E9E9E9
| 264280 ||  || — || November 22, 1997 || Kitt Peak || Spacewatch || — || align=right | 1.1 km || 
|-id=281 bgcolor=#E9E9E9
| 264281 ||  || — || February 23, 1998 || Xinglong || SCAP || — || align=right | 2.7 km || 
|-id=282 bgcolor=#E9E9E9
| 264282 ||  || — || March 20, 1998 || Socorro || LINEAR || — || align=right | 3.8 km || 
|-id=283 bgcolor=#E9E9E9
| 264283 ||  || — || March 28, 1998 || Socorro || LINEAR || JUN || align=right | 1.5 km || 
|-id=284 bgcolor=#E9E9E9
| 264284 ||  || — || April 2, 1998 || Socorro || LINEAR || — || align=right | 3.9 km || 
|-id=285 bgcolor=#FA8072
| 264285 || 1998 QM || — || August 17, 1998 || Socorro || LINEAR || — || align=right | 1.5 km || 
|-id=286 bgcolor=#fefefe
| 264286 ||  || — || August 17, 1998 || Socorro || LINEAR || CIM || align=right | 2.5 km || 
|-id=287 bgcolor=#fefefe
| 264287 ||  || — || August 26, 1998 || La Silla || E. W. Elst || — || align=right | 1.4 km || 
|-id=288 bgcolor=#d6d6d6
| 264288 ||  || — || September 14, 1998 || Socorro || LINEAR || — || align=right | 2.5 km || 
|-id=289 bgcolor=#fefefe
| 264289 ||  || — || September 20, 1998 || Kitt Peak || Spacewatch || V || align=right data-sort-value="0.89" | 890 m || 
|-id=290 bgcolor=#fefefe
| 264290 ||  || — || September 20, 1998 || Xinglong || SCAP || — || align=right | 1.1 km || 
|-id=291 bgcolor=#d6d6d6
| 264291 ||  || — || September 21, 1998 || Kitt Peak || Spacewatch || — || align=right | 4.6 km || 
|-id=292 bgcolor=#fefefe
| 264292 ||  || — || September 23, 1998 || Kitt Peak || Spacewatch || MAS || align=right data-sort-value="0.87" | 870 m || 
|-id=293 bgcolor=#fefefe
| 264293 ||  || — || September 26, 1998 || Socorro || LINEAR || NYS || align=right data-sort-value="0.77" | 770 m || 
|-id=294 bgcolor=#d6d6d6
| 264294 ||  || — || October 12, 1998 || Kitt Peak || Spacewatch || THM || align=right | 2.6 km || 
|-id=295 bgcolor=#fefefe
| 264295 ||  || — || October 13, 1998 || Kitt Peak || Spacewatch || — || align=right data-sort-value="0.88" | 880 m || 
|-id=296 bgcolor=#fefefe
| 264296 ||  || — || October 13, 1998 || Kitt Peak || Spacewatch || V || align=right | 1.0 km || 
|-id=297 bgcolor=#fefefe
| 264297 ||  || — || November 10, 1998 || Caussols || ODAS || MAS || align=right | 1.1 km || 
|-id=298 bgcolor=#E9E9E9
| 264298 ||  || — || November 16, 1998 || Fair Oaks Ranch || J. V. McClusky || — || align=right | 1.7 km || 
|-id=299 bgcolor=#d6d6d6
| 264299 ||  || — || December 10, 1998 || Kitt Peak || Spacewatch || EOS || align=right | 2.9 km || 
|-id=300 bgcolor=#d6d6d6
| 264300 ||  || — || December 22, 1998 || Kitt Peak || Spacewatch || — || align=right | 3.7 km || 
|}

264301–264400 

|-bgcolor=#E9E9E9
| 264301 ||  || — || January 13, 1999 || Kitt Peak || Spacewatch || — || align=right data-sort-value="0.77" | 770 m || 
|-id=302 bgcolor=#E9E9E9
| 264302 ||  || — || February 10, 1999 || Socorro || LINEAR || — || align=right | 1.7 km || 
|-id=303 bgcolor=#d6d6d6
| 264303 ||  || — || March 20, 1999 || Apache Point || SDSS || — || align=right | 5.3 km || 
|-id=304 bgcolor=#E9E9E9
| 264304 ||  || — || March 20, 1999 || Apache Point || SDSS || — || align=right | 1.8 km || 
|-id=305 bgcolor=#E9E9E9
| 264305 ||  || — || May 18, 1999 || Socorro || LINEAR || — || align=right | 1.3 km || 
|-id=306 bgcolor=#E9E9E9
| 264306 ||  || — || June 9, 1999 || Socorro || LINEAR || — || align=right | 3.6 km || 
|-id=307 bgcolor=#E9E9E9
| 264307 ||  || — || June 9, 1999 || Kitt Peak || Spacewatch || — || align=right | 1.7 km || 
|-id=308 bgcolor=#FFC2E0
| 264308 ||  || — || July 13, 1999 || Socorro || LINEAR || AMO || align=right data-sort-value="0.31" | 310 m || 
|-id=309 bgcolor=#E9E9E9
| 264309 ||  || — || September 7, 1999 || Socorro || LINEAR || — || align=right | 4.4 km || 
|-id=310 bgcolor=#FA8072
| 264310 ||  || — || September 7, 1999 || Socorro || LINEAR || — || align=right data-sort-value="0.99" | 990 m || 
|-id=311 bgcolor=#fefefe
| 264311 ||  || — || September 9, 1999 || Socorro || LINEAR || NYS || align=right data-sort-value="0.96" | 960 m || 
|-id=312 bgcolor=#fefefe
| 264312 ||  || — || September 9, 1999 || Socorro || LINEAR || — || align=right data-sort-value="0.98" | 980 m || 
|-id=313 bgcolor=#fefefe
| 264313 ||  || — || October 3, 1999 || Kitt Peak || Spacewatch || NYS || align=right data-sort-value="0.74" | 740 m || 
|-id=314 bgcolor=#d6d6d6
| 264314 ||  || — || October 9, 1999 || Kitt Peak || Spacewatch || — || align=right | 1.9 km || 
|-id=315 bgcolor=#fefefe
| 264315 ||  || — || October 13, 1999 || Kitt Peak || Spacewatch || FLO || align=right data-sort-value="0.78" | 780 m || 
|-id=316 bgcolor=#fefefe
| 264316 ||  || — || October 4, 1999 || Socorro || LINEAR || FLO || align=right data-sort-value="0.85" | 850 m || 
|-id=317 bgcolor=#fefefe
| 264317 ||  || — || October 6, 1999 || Socorro || LINEAR || ERI || align=right | 2.3 km || 
|-id=318 bgcolor=#fefefe
| 264318 ||  || — || October 7, 1999 || Socorro || LINEAR || NYS || align=right data-sort-value="0.84" | 840 m || 
|-id=319 bgcolor=#fefefe
| 264319 ||  || — || October 7, 1999 || Socorro || LINEAR || — || align=right | 1.0 km || 
|-id=320 bgcolor=#fefefe
| 264320 ||  || — || October 8, 1999 || Socorro || LINEAR || V || align=right data-sort-value="0.76" | 760 m || 
|-id=321 bgcolor=#fefefe
| 264321 ||  || — || October 14, 1999 || Socorro || LINEAR || — || align=right data-sort-value="0.93" | 930 m || 
|-id=322 bgcolor=#fefefe
| 264322 ||  || — || October 9, 1999 || Catalina || CSS || — || align=right | 2.3 km || 
|-id=323 bgcolor=#d6d6d6
| 264323 ||  || — || October 15, 1999 || Kitt Peak || Spacewatch || CHA || align=right | 2.2 km || 
|-id=324 bgcolor=#fefefe
| 264324 ||  || — || October 3, 1999 || Socorro || LINEAR || — || align=right | 1.1 km || 
|-id=325 bgcolor=#fefefe
| 264325 ||  || — || October 9, 1999 || Socorro || LINEAR || — || align=right | 1.1 km || 
|-id=326 bgcolor=#fefefe
| 264326 ||  || — || October 10, 1999 || Socorro || LINEAR || — || align=right | 1.2 km || 
|-id=327 bgcolor=#d6d6d6
| 264327 ||  || — || October 3, 1999 || Kitt Peak || Spacewatch || THM || align=right | 2.0 km || 
|-id=328 bgcolor=#d6d6d6
| 264328 ||  || — || October 20, 1999 || Kitt Peak || Spacewatch || THM || align=right | 2.2 km || 
|-id=329 bgcolor=#fefefe
| 264329 ||  || — || October 31, 1999 || Kitt Peak || Spacewatch || — || align=right data-sort-value="0.61" | 610 m || 
|-id=330 bgcolor=#d6d6d6
| 264330 ||  || — || October 16, 1999 || Kitt Peak || Spacewatch || — || align=right | 4.2 km || 
|-id=331 bgcolor=#fefefe
| 264331 ||  || — || October 29, 1999 || Catalina || CSS || V || align=right data-sort-value="0.89" | 890 m || 
|-id=332 bgcolor=#fefefe
| 264332 ||  || — || November 4, 1999 || Socorro || LINEAR || NYS || align=right data-sort-value="0.78" | 780 m || 
|-id=333 bgcolor=#fefefe
| 264333 ||  || — || November 9, 1999 || Socorro || LINEAR || EUT || align=right data-sort-value="0.67" | 670 m || 
|-id=334 bgcolor=#d6d6d6
| 264334 ||  || — || November 5, 1999 || Kitt Peak || Spacewatch || EOS || align=right | 1.8 km || 
|-id=335 bgcolor=#d6d6d6
| 264335 ||  || — || November 9, 1999 || Kitt Peak || Spacewatch || — || align=right | 2.6 km || 
|-id=336 bgcolor=#d6d6d6
| 264336 ||  || — || November 10, 1999 || Kitt Peak || Spacewatch || — || align=right | 3.0 km || 
|-id=337 bgcolor=#d6d6d6
| 264337 ||  || — || November 10, 1999 || Kitt Peak || Spacewatch || KOR || align=right | 1.3 km || 
|-id=338 bgcolor=#d6d6d6
| 264338 ||  || — || November 9, 1999 || Kitt Peak || Spacewatch || THM || align=right | 2.1 km || 
|-id=339 bgcolor=#fefefe
| 264339 ||  || — || November 14, 1999 || Socorro || LINEAR || NYS || align=right data-sort-value="0.91" | 910 m || 
|-id=340 bgcolor=#fefefe
| 264340 ||  || — || December 6, 1999 || Socorro || LINEAR || — || align=right | 1.8 km || 
|-id=341 bgcolor=#FA8072
| 264341 ||  || — || December 7, 1999 || Socorro || LINEAR || PHO || align=right | 2.1 km || 
|-id=342 bgcolor=#fefefe
| 264342 ||  || — || December 7, 1999 || Socorro || LINEAR || NYS || align=right data-sort-value="0.77" | 770 m || 
|-id=343 bgcolor=#fefefe
| 264343 ||  || — || December 7, 1999 || Socorro || LINEAR || — || align=right | 1.1 km || 
|-id=344 bgcolor=#d6d6d6
| 264344 ||  || — || December 7, 1999 || Socorro || LINEAR || — || align=right | 4.1 km || 
|-id=345 bgcolor=#d6d6d6
| 264345 ||  || — || December 7, 1999 || Socorro || LINEAR || EOS || align=right | 3.3 km || 
|-id=346 bgcolor=#fefefe
| 264346 ||  || — || December 11, 1999 || Prescott || P. G. Comba || H || align=right | 1.1 km || 
|-id=347 bgcolor=#fefefe
| 264347 ||  || — || December 13, 1999 || Socorro || LINEAR || — || align=right | 3.0 km || 
|-id=348 bgcolor=#fefefe
| 264348 ||  || — || December 15, 1999 || Prescott || P. G. Comba || — || align=right | 1.1 km || 
|-id=349 bgcolor=#d6d6d6
| 264349 ||  || — || December 7, 1999 || Kitt Peak || Spacewatch || EOS || align=right | 2.6 km || 
|-id=350 bgcolor=#FA8072
| 264350 ||  || — || December 12, 1999 || Socorro || LINEAR || H || align=right | 1.1 km || 
|-id=351 bgcolor=#fefefe
| 264351 ||  || — || December 4, 1999 || Anderson Mesa || LONEOS || — || align=right | 1.2 km || 
|-id=352 bgcolor=#d6d6d6
| 264352 ||  || — || December 5, 1999 || Catalina || CSS || — || align=right | 5.6 km || 
|-id=353 bgcolor=#fefefe
| 264353 ||  || — || December 27, 1999 || Kitt Peak || Spacewatch || V || align=right data-sort-value="0.92" | 920 m || 
|-id=354 bgcolor=#d6d6d6
| 264354 ||  || — || January 3, 2000 || Socorro || LINEAR || — || align=right | 3.9 km || 
|-id=355 bgcolor=#fefefe
| 264355 ||  || — || January 5, 2000 || Kitt Peak || Spacewatch || NYS || align=right data-sort-value="0.69" | 690 m || 
|-id=356 bgcolor=#fefefe
| 264356 ||  || — || January 5, 2000 || Kitt Peak || Spacewatch || NYS || align=right data-sort-value="0.79" | 790 m || 
|-id=357 bgcolor=#FFC2E0
| 264357 ||  || — || January 7, 2000 || Socorro || LINEAR || ATEPHA || align=right data-sort-value="0.11" | 110 m || 
|-id=358 bgcolor=#fefefe
| 264358 ||  || — || January 4, 2000 || Socorro || LINEAR || — || align=right | 1.3 km || 
|-id=359 bgcolor=#fefefe
| 264359 ||  || — || January 5, 2000 || Kitt Peak || Spacewatch || — || align=right data-sort-value="0.80" | 800 m || 
|-id=360 bgcolor=#fefefe
| 264360 ||  || — || January 5, 2000 || Kitt Peak || Spacewatch || — || align=right | 1.1 km || 
|-id=361 bgcolor=#d6d6d6
| 264361 ||  || — || January 27, 2000 || Socorro || LINEAR || — || align=right | 3.6 km || 
|-id=362 bgcolor=#fefefe
| 264362 ||  || — || January 30, 2000 || Socorro || LINEAR || — || align=right | 1.2 km || 
|-id=363 bgcolor=#d6d6d6
| 264363 ||  || — || January 31, 2000 || Kitt Peak || Spacewatch || — || align=right | 3.7 km || 
|-id=364 bgcolor=#fefefe
| 264364 ||  || — || February 4, 2000 || Socorro || LINEAR || ERI || align=right | 2.3 km || 
|-id=365 bgcolor=#fefefe
| 264365 ||  || — || February 8, 2000 || Kitt Peak || Spacewatch || — || align=right data-sort-value="0.82" | 820 m || 
|-id=366 bgcolor=#fefefe
| 264366 ||  || — || February 8, 2000 || Kitt Peak || Spacewatch || NYS || align=right data-sort-value="0.64" | 640 m || 
|-id=367 bgcolor=#d6d6d6
| 264367 ||  || — || February 5, 2000 || Kitt Peak || M. W. Buie || EOS || align=right | 2.4 km || 
|-id=368 bgcolor=#fefefe
| 264368 ||  || — || February 5, 2000 || Kitt Peak || M. W. Buie || — || align=right | 1.2 km || 
|-id=369 bgcolor=#fefefe
| 264369 ||  || — || February 3, 2000 || Kitt Peak || Spacewatch || MAS || align=right data-sort-value="0.86" | 860 m || 
|-id=370 bgcolor=#d6d6d6
| 264370 ||  || — || February 26, 2000 || Kitt Peak || Spacewatch || — || align=right | 2.9 km || 
|-id=371 bgcolor=#d6d6d6
| 264371 ||  || — || February 26, 2000 || Kitt Peak || Spacewatch || — || align=right | 3.0 km || 
|-id=372 bgcolor=#d6d6d6
| 264372 ||  || — || February 26, 2000 || Kitt Peak || Spacewatch || — || align=right | 2.3 km || 
|-id=373 bgcolor=#fefefe
| 264373 ||  || — || February 29, 2000 || Socorro || LINEAR || H || align=right | 1.2 km || 
|-id=374 bgcolor=#fefefe
| 264374 ||  || — || February 29, 2000 || Socorro || LINEAR || ERI || align=right | 3.0 km || 
|-id=375 bgcolor=#d6d6d6
| 264375 ||  || — || February 29, 2000 || Socorro || LINEAR || — || align=right | 6.4 km || 
|-id=376 bgcolor=#fefefe
| 264376 ||  || — || February 29, 2000 || Socorro || LINEAR || V || align=right | 1.0 km || 
|-id=377 bgcolor=#fefefe
| 264377 ||  || — || February 29, 2000 || Socorro || LINEAR || — || align=right | 1.2 km || 
|-id=378 bgcolor=#d6d6d6
| 264378 ||  || — || February 29, 2000 || Socorro || LINEAR || — || align=right | 4.0 km || 
|-id=379 bgcolor=#fefefe
| 264379 ||  || — || February 29, 2000 || Socorro || LINEAR || — || align=right | 1.2 km || 
|-id=380 bgcolor=#fefefe
| 264380 ||  || — || February 29, 2000 || Socorro || LINEAR || — || align=right data-sort-value="0.91" | 910 m || 
|-id=381 bgcolor=#fefefe
| 264381 ||  || — || February 29, 2000 || Socorro || LINEAR || ERI || align=right | 2.5 km || 
|-id=382 bgcolor=#d6d6d6
| 264382 ||  || — || February 29, 2000 || Socorro || LINEAR || — || align=right | 4.7 km || 
|-id=383 bgcolor=#fefefe
| 264383 ||  || — || February 29, 2000 || Socorro || LINEAR || NYS || align=right | 1.1 km || 
|-id=384 bgcolor=#d6d6d6
| 264384 ||  || — || February 29, 2000 || Socorro || LINEAR || — || align=right | 3.3 km || 
|-id=385 bgcolor=#fefefe
| 264385 ||  || — || February 29, 2000 || Socorro || LINEAR || — || align=right | 1.1 km || 
|-id=386 bgcolor=#fefefe
| 264386 ||  || — || February 29, 2000 || Socorro || LINEAR || — || align=right | 1.1 km || 
|-id=387 bgcolor=#C2FFFF
| 264387 ||  || — || February 26, 2000 || Kitt Peak || Spacewatch || L4 || align=right | 11 km || 
|-id=388 bgcolor=#fefefe
| 264388 ||  || — || February 27, 2000 || Kitt Peak || Spacewatch || — || align=right | 1.0 km || 
|-id=389 bgcolor=#d6d6d6
| 264389 ||  || — || February 27, 2000 || Kitt Peak || Spacewatch || HYG || align=right | 3.0 km || 
|-id=390 bgcolor=#d6d6d6
| 264390 ||  || — || February 27, 2000 || Kitt Peak || Spacewatch || — || align=right | 4.5 km || 
|-id=391 bgcolor=#fefefe
| 264391 ||  || — || March 3, 2000 || Socorro || LINEAR || — || align=right data-sort-value="0.98" | 980 m || 
|-id=392 bgcolor=#d6d6d6
| 264392 ||  || — || March 3, 2000 || Socorro || LINEAR || TIR || align=right | 4.3 km || 
|-id=393 bgcolor=#d6d6d6
| 264393 ||  || — || March 3, 2000 || Socorro || LINEAR || EUP || align=right | 6.0 km || 
|-id=394 bgcolor=#fefefe
| 264394 ||  || — || March 5, 2000 || Socorro || LINEAR || H || align=right | 1.4 km || 
|-id=395 bgcolor=#fefefe
| 264395 ||  || — || March 3, 2000 || Socorro || LINEAR || V || align=right data-sort-value="0.92" | 920 m || 
|-id=396 bgcolor=#E9E9E9
| 264396 ||  || — || March 3, 2000 || Kitt Peak || Spacewatch || — || align=right data-sort-value="0.97" | 970 m || 
|-id=397 bgcolor=#fefefe
| 264397 ||  || — || March 12, 2000 || Kitt Peak || Spacewatch || V || align=right data-sort-value="0.95" | 950 m || 
|-id=398 bgcolor=#fefefe
| 264398 ||  || — || March 10, 2000 || Kitt Peak || Spacewatch || NYS || align=right data-sort-value="0.81" | 810 m || 
|-id=399 bgcolor=#fefefe
| 264399 ||  || — || March 11, 2000 || Socorro || LINEAR || — || align=right | 1.1 km || 
|-id=400 bgcolor=#fefefe
| 264400 ||  || — || March 11, 2000 || Socorro || LINEAR || NYS || align=right data-sort-value="0.76" | 760 m || 
|}

264401–264500 

|-bgcolor=#d6d6d6
| 264401 ||  || — || March 1, 2000 || Catalina || CSS || EUP || align=right | 5.1 km || 
|-id=402 bgcolor=#fefefe
| 264402 ||  || — || March 30, 2000 || Kitt Peak || Spacewatch || NYS || align=right data-sort-value="0.75" | 750 m || 
|-id=403 bgcolor=#fefefe
| 264403 ||  || — || March 26, 2000 || Anderson Mesa || LONEOS || — || align=right | 1.4 km || 
|-id=404 bgcolor=#E9E9E9
| 264404 ||  || — || March 29, 2000 || Kitt Peak || Spacewatch || — || align=right | 1.5 km || 
|-id=405 bgcolor=#fefefe
| 264405 ||  || — || April 4, 2000 || Socorro || LINEAR || H || align=right data-sort-value="0.92" | 920 m || 
|-id=406 bgcolor=#fefefe
| 264406 ||  || — || April 5, 2000 || Socorro || LINEAR || — || align=right data-sort-value="0.90" | 900 m || 
|-id=407 bgcolor=#fefefe
| 264407 ||  || — || April 5, 2000 || Socorro || LINEAR || — || align=right | 1.2 km || 
|-id=408 bgcolor=#fefefe
| 264408 ||  || — || April 5, 2000 || Socorro || LINEAR || MAS || align=right data-sort-value="0.91" | 910 m || 
|-id=409 bgcolor=#d6d6d6
| 264409 ||  || — || April 8, 2000 || Socorro || LINEAR || THB || align=right | 5.7 km || 
|-id=410 bgcolor=#fefefe
| 264410 ||  || — || April 5, 2000 || Kitt Peak || Spacewatch || NYS || align=right data-sort-value="0.71" | 710 m || 
|-id=411 bgcolor=#d6d6d6
| 264411 ||  || — || April 30, 2000 || Haleakala || NEAT || EUP || align=right | 5.0 km || 
|-id=412 bgcolor=#fefefe
| 264412 ||  || — || April 28, 2000 || Kitt Peak || Spacewatch || — || align=right | 1.2 km || 
|-id=413 bgcolor=#E9E9E9
| 264413 ||  || — || June 5, 2000 || Anderson Mesa || LONEOS || — || align=right | 1.8 km || 
|-id=414 bgcolor=#E9E9E9
| 264414 ||  || — || July 29, 2000 || Lake Tekapo || Mount John Obs. || — || align=right | 3.1 km || 
|-id=415 bgcolor=#E9E9E9
| 264415 ||  || — || August 1, 2000 || Socorro || LINEAR || — || align=right | 3.0 km || 
|-id=416 bgcolor=#E9E9E9
| 264416 ||  || — || August 1, 2000 || Socorro || LINEAR || — || align=right | 2.6 km || 
|-id=417 bgcolor=#E9E9E9
| 264417 ||  || — || August 24, 2000 || Socorro || LINEAR || CLO || align=right | 2.6 km || 
|-id=418 bgcolor=#E9E9E9
| 264418 ||  || — || August 26, 2000 || Socorro || LINEAR || — || align=right | 2.5 km || 
|-id=419 bgcolor=#E9E9E9
| 264419 ||  || — || August 31, 2000 || Socorro || LINEAR || — || align=right | 2.6 km || 
|-id=420 bgcolor=#E9E9E9
| 264420 ||  || — || August 31, 2000 || Socorro || LINEAR || — || align=right | 3.2 km || 
|-id=421 bgcolor=#fefefe
| 264421 ||  || — || August 29, 2000 || Socorro || LINEAR || — || align=right | 1.0 km || 
|-id=422 bgcolor=#E9E9E9
| 264422 ||  || — || August 21, 2000 || Anderson Mesa || LONEOS || — || align=right | 1.5 km || 
|-id=423 bgcolor=#d6d6d6
| 264423 ||  || — || August 31, 2000 || Kvistaberg || UDAS || — || align=right | 4.1 km || 
|-id=424 bgcolor=#E9E9E9
| 264424 ||  || — || September 1, 2000 || Socorro || LINEAR || — || align=right | 3.2 km || 
|-id=425 bgcolor=#E9E9E9
| 264425 ||  || — || September 1, 2000 || Socorro || LINEAR || — || align=right | 2.5 km || 
|-id=426 bgcolor=#E9E9E9
| 264426 ||  || — || September 3, 2000 || Socorro || LINEAR || — || align=right | 2.2 km || 
|-id=427 bgcolor=#E9E9E9
| 264427 ||  || — || September 2, 2000 || Anderson Mesa || LONEOS || ADE || align=right | 3.6 km || 
|-id=428 bgcolor=#E9E9E9
| 264428 ||  || — || September 3, 2000 || Socorro || LINEAR || — || align=right | 3.0 km || 
|-id=429 bgcolor=#E9E9E9
| 264429 ||  || — || September 23, 2000 || Socorro || LINEAR || — || align=right | 3.2 km || 
|-id=430 bgcolor=#E9E9E9
| 264430 ||  || — || September 23, 2000 || Socorro || LINEAR || ADE || align=right | 4.2 km || 
|-id=431 bgcolor=#FA8072
| 264431 ||  || — || September 24, 2000 || Socorro || LINEAR || — || align=right data-sort-value="0.92" | 920 m || 
|-id=432 bgcolor=#E9E9E9
| 264432 ||  || — || September 23, 2000 || Socorro || LINEAR || AER || align=right | 2.2 km || 
|-id=433 bgcolor=#E9E9E9
| 264433 ||  || — || September 23, 2000 || Socorro || LINEAR || — || align=right | 3.7 km || 
|-id=434 bgcolor=#E9E9E9
| 264434 ||  || — || September 25, 2000 || Socorro || LINEAR || GER || align=right | 2.1 km || 
|-id=435 bgcolor=#d6d6d6
| 264435 ||  || — || September 23, 2000 || Socorro || LINEAR || — || align=right | 1.9 km || 
|-id=436 bgcolor=#fefefe
| 264436 ||  || — || September 23, 2000 || Socorro || LINEAR || — || align=right data-sort-value="0.89" | 890 m || 
|-id=437 bgcolor=#E9E9E9
| 264437 ||  || — || September 24, 2000 || Socorro || LINEAR || — || align=right | 3.4 km || 
|-id=438 bgcolor=#E9E9E9
| 264438 ||  || — || September 26, 2000 || Socorro || LINEAR || — || align=right | 2.0 km || 
|-id=439 bgcolor=#fefefe
| 264439 ||  || — || September 28, 2000 || Socorro || LINEAR || — || align=right data-sort-value="0.86" | 860 m || 
|-id=440 bgcolor=#E9E9E9
| 264440 ||  || — || September 24, 2000 || Socorro || LINEAR || AGN || align=right | 2.0 km || 
|-id=441 bgcolor=#E9E9E9
| 264441 ||  || — || September 26, 2000 || Socorro || LINEAR || — || align=right | 2.6 km || 
|-id=442 bgcolor=#E9E9E9
| 264442 ||  || — || September 27, 2000 || Socorro || LINEAR || — || align=right | 3.4 km || 
|-id=443 bgcolor=#E9E9E9
| 264443 ||  || — || September 30, 2000 || Socorro || LINEAR || — || align=right | 3.2 km || 
|-id=444 bgcolor=#E9E9E9
| 264444 ||  || — || September 30, 2000 || Kitt Peak || Spacewatch || — || align=right | 1.8 km || 
|-id=445 bgcolor=#E9E9E9
| 264445 ||  || — || September 23, 2000 || Anderson Mesa || LONEOS || — || align=right | 3.3 km || 
|-id=446 bgcolor=#fefefe
| 264446 ||  || — || September 24, 2000 || Socorro || LINEAR || — || align=right data-sort-value="0.85" | 850 m || 
|-id=447 bgcolor=#E9E9E9
| 264447 ||  || — || October 2, 2000 || Socorro || LINEAR || EUN || align=right | 2.1 km || 
|-id=448 bgcolor=#E9E9E9
| 264448 ||  || — || October 4, 2000 || Socorro || LINEAR || — || align=right | 2.8 km || 
|-id=449 bgcolor=#fefefe
| 264449 ||  || — || October 24, 2000 || Socorro || LINEAR || fast? || align=right data-sort-value="0.96" | 960 m || 
|-id=450 bgcolor=#E9E9E9
| 264450 ||  || — || October 25, 2000 || Socorro || LINEAR || — || align=right | 3.3 km || 
|-id=451 bgcolor=#E9E9E9
| 264451 ||  || — || October 29, 2000 || Socorro || LINEAR || — || align=right | 3.4 km || 
|-id=452 bgcolor=#fefefe
| 264452 ||  || — || October 25, 2000 || Socorro || LINEAR || — || align=right data-sort-value="0.79" | 790 m || 
|-id=453 bgcolor=#d6d6d6
| 264453 ||  || — || November 1, 2000 || Socorro || LINEAR || — || align=right | 3.4 km || 
|-id=454 bgcolor=#fefefe
| 264454 ||  || — || November 20, 2000 || Socorro || LINEAR || — || align=right | 1.1 km || 
|-id=455 bgcolor=#d6d6d6
| 264455 ||  || — || November 25, 2000 || Socorro || LINEAR || — || align=right | 3.2 km || 
|-id=456 bgcolor=#fefefe
| 264456 ||  || — || December 30, 2000 || Socorro || LINEAR || FLO || align=right data-sort-value="0.87" | 870 m || 
|-id=457 bgcolor=#d6d6d6
| 264457 ||  || — || December 20, 2000 || Socorro || LINEAR || 615 || align=right | 1.8 km || 
|-id=458 bgcolor=#d6d6d6
| 264458 ||  || — || January 4, 2001 || Socorro || LINEAR || — || align=right | 3.6 km || 
|-id=459 bgcolor=#fefefe
| 264459 ||  || — || February 13, 2001 || Socorro || LINEAR || — || align=right | 1.1 km || 
|-id=460 bgcolor=#FA8072
| 264460 ||  || — || February 15, 2001 || Socorro || LINEAR || H || align=right data-sort-value="0.80" | 800 m || 
|-id=461 bgcolor=#d6d6d6
| 264461 ||  || — || February 15, 2001 || Socorro || LINEAR || — || align=right | 3.5 km || 
|-id=462 bgcolor=#d6d6d6
| 264462 ||  || — || February 16, 2001 || Oizumi || T. Kobayashi || — || align=right | 2.9 km || 
|-id=463 bgcolor=#fefefe
| 264463 ||  || — || February 19, 2001 || Socorro || LINEAR || — || align=right | 1.2 km || 
|-id=464 bgcolor=#fefefe
| 264464 ||  || — || February 16, 2001 || Kitt Peak || Spacewatch || — || align=right data-sort-value="0.75" | 750 m || 
|-id=465 bgcolor=#fefefe
| 264465 ||  || — || February 17, 2001 || Socorro || LINEAR || — || align=right | 1.1 km || 
|-id=466 bgcolor=#d6d6d6
| 264466 ||  || — || February 16, 2001 || Anderson Mesa || LONEOS || — || align=right | 3.3 km || 
|-id=467 bgcolor=#fefefe
| 264467 ||  || — || March 20, 2001 || Haleakala || NEAT || — || align=right data-sort-value="0.97" | 970 m || 
|-id=468 bgcolor=#fefefe
| 264468 ||  || — || March 26, 2001 || Cerro Tololo || DLS || EUT || align=right | 1.0 km || 
|-id=469 bgcolor=#d6d6d6
| 264469 ||  || — || March 19, 2001 || Anderson Mesa || LONEOS || — || align=right | 4.7 km || 
|-id=470 bgcolor=#d6d6d6
| 264470 ||  || — || March 23, 2001 || Haleakala || NEAT || — || align=right | 5.0 km || 
|-id=471 bgcolor=#fefefe
| 264471 ||  || — || March 22, 2001 || Kitt Peak || Spacewatch || — || align=right data-sort-value="0.70" | 700 m || 
|-id=472 bgcolor=#d6d6d6
| 264472 ||  || — || March 20, 2001 || Anderson Mesa || LONEOS || — || align=right | 3.4 km || 
|-id=473 bgcolor=#d6d6d6
| 264473 ||  || — || March 21, 2001 || Kitt Peak || SKADS || — || align=right | 2.5 km || 
|-id=474 bgcolor=#d6d6d6
| 264474 Rogerclark ||  ||  || March 21, 2001 || Kitt Peak || SKADS || — || align=right | 2.8 km || 
|-id=475 bgcolor=#fefefe
| 264475 ||  || — || April 13, 2001 || Kitt Peak || Spacewatch || — || align=right data-sort-value="0.91" | 910 m || 
|-id=476 bgcolor=#fefefe
| 264476 Aepic || 2001 HP ||  || April 16, 2001 || Saint-Véran || Saint-Véran Obs. || NYS || align=right data-sort-value="0.69" | 690 m || 
|-id=477 bgcolor=#d6d6d6
| 264477 ||  || — || May 18, 2001 || Socorro || LINEAR || — || align=right | 5.2 km || 
|-id=478 bgcolor=#d6d6d6
| 264478 ||  || — || May 17, 2001 || Socorro || LINEAR || — || align=right | 4.5 km || 
|-id=479 bgcolor=#fefefe
| 264479 ||  || — || June 27, 2001 || Palomar || NEAT || ERI || align=right | 1.9 km || 
|-id=480 bgcolor=#fefefe
| 264480 ||  || — || July 14, 2001 || Palomar || NEAT || — || align=right data-sort-value="0.95" | 950 m || 
|-id=481 bgcolor=#fefefe
| 264481 ||  || — || July 18, 2001 || Palomar || NEAT || — || align=right | 1.4 km || 
|-id=482 bgcolor=#fefefe
| 264482 ||  || — || July 19, 2001 || Palomar || NEAT || — || align=right | 1.1 km || 
|-id=483 bgcolor=#E9E9E9
| 264483 ||  || — || July 20, 2001 || Palomar || NEAT || — || align=right | 1.6 km || 
|-id=484 bgcolor=#fefefe
| 264484 ||  || — || July 20, 2001 || Palomar || NEAT || PHO || align=right | 1.8 km || 
|-id=485 bgcolor=#E9E9E9
| 264485 ||  || — || July 17, 2001 || Palomar || NEAT || — || align=right | 1.8 km || 
|-id=486 bgcolor=#d6d6d6
| 264486 ||  || — || July 27, 2001 || Palomar || NEAT || — || align=right | 5.7 km || 
|-id=487 bgcolor=#E9E9E9
| 264487 ||  || — || July 27, 2001 || Palomar || NEAT || — || align=right | 2.2 km || 
|-id=488 bgcolor=#fefefe
| 264488 ||  || — || August 1, 2001 || Palomar || NEAT || H || align=right | 1.2 km || 
|-id=489 bgcolor=#fefefe
| 264489 ||  || — || August 10, 2001 || Palomar || NEAT || — || align=right | 2.0 km || 
|-id=490 bgcolor=#fefefe
| 264490 ||  || — || August 10, 2001 || Palomar || NEAT || H || align=right data-sort-value="0.76" | 760 m || 
|-id=491 bgcolor=#fefefe
| 264491 ||  || — || August 15, 2001 || Haleakala || NEAT || ERI || align=right | 2.3 km || 
|-id=492 bgcolor=#E9E9E9
| 264492 ||  || — || August 14, 2001 || Palomar || NEAT || EUN || align=right | 1.6 km || 
|-id=493 bgcolor=#E9E9E9
| 264493 ||  || — || August 15, 2001 || Ondřejov || Ondřejov Obs. || — || align=right data-sort-value="0.98" | 980 m || 
|-id=494 bgcolor=#E9E9E9
| 264494 ||  || — || August 16, 2001 || Socorro || LINEAR || — || align=right | 1.2 km || 
|-id=495 bgcolor=#fefefe
| 264495 ||  || — || August 16, 2001 || Socorro || LINEAR || — || align=right | 1.6 km || 
|-id=496 bgcolor=#fefefe
| 264496 ||  || — || August 16, 2001 || Socorro || LINEAR || H || align=right data-sort-value="0.84" | 840 m || 
|-id=497 bgcolor=#E9E9E9
| 264497 ||  || — || August 16, 2001 || Socorro || LINEAR || — || align=right | 1.4 km || 
|-id=498 bgcolor=#E9E9E9
| 264498 ||  || — || August 16, 2001 || Socorro || LINEAR || — || align=right | 1.5 km || 
|-id=499 bgcolor=#E9E9E9
| 264499 ||  || — || August 16, 2001 || Socorro || LINEAR || — || align=right | 1.1 km || 
|-id=500 bgcolor=#E9E9E9
| 264500 ||  || — || August 16, 2001 || Socorro || LINEAR || — || align=right | 1.6 km || 
|}

264501–264600 

|-bgcolor=#fefefe
| 264501 ||  || — || August 22, 2001 || Socorro || LINEAR || H || align=right data-sort-value="0.91" | 910 m || 
|-id=502 bgcolor=#E9E9E9
| 264502 ||  || — || August 17, 2001 || Socorro || LINEAR || BAR || align=right | 1.6 km || 
|-id=503 bgcolor=#E9E9E9
| 264503 ||  || — || August 22, 2001 || Socorro || LINEAR || — || align=right | 1.7 km || 
|-id=504 bgcolor=#fefefe
| 264504 ||  || — || August 22, 2001 || Socorro || LINEAR || H || align=right data-sort-value="0.93" | 930 m || 
|-id=505 bgcolor=#E9E9E9
| 264505 ||  || — || August 23, 2001 || Anderson Mesa || LONEOS || — || align=right | 1.2 km || 
|-id=506 bgcolor=#E9E9E9
| 264506 ||  || — || August 31, 2001 || Desert Eagle || W. K. Y. Yeung || — || align=right | 2.2 km || 
|-id=507 bgcolor=#E9E9E9
| 264507 ||  || — || August 25, 2001 || Socorro || LINEAR || — || align=right | 1.0 km || 
|-id=508 bgcolor=#E9E9E9
| 264508 ||  || — || August 26, 2001 || Kitt Peak || Spacewatch || — || align=right data-sort-value="0.96" | 960 m || 
|-id=509 bgcolor=#E9E9E9
| 264509 ||  || — || August 23, 2001 || Anderson Mesa || LONEOS || — || align=right | 1.3 km || 
|-id=510 bgcolor=#E9E9E9
| 264510 ||  || — || August 23, 2001 || Anderson Mesa || LONEOS || — || align=right | 1.7 km || 
|-id=511 bgcolor=#E9E9E9
| 264511 ||  || — || August 23, 2001 || Anderson Mesa || LONEOS || — || align=right | 1.4 km || 
|-id=512 bgcolor=#fefefe
| 264512 ||  || — || August 23, 2001 || Anderson Mesa || LONEOS || — || align=right | 1.4 km || 
|-id=513 bgcolor=#E9E9E9
| 264513 ||  || — || August 24, 2001 || Anderson Mesa || LONEOS || — || align=right | 1.6 km || 
|-id=514 bgcolor=#E9E9E9
| 264514 ||  || — || August 24, 2001 || Socorro || LINEAR || — || align=right | 1.6 km || 
|-id=515 bgcolor=#E9E9E9
| 264515 ||  || — || August 25, 2001 || Socorro || LINEAR || EUN || align=right | 1.5 km || 
|-id=516 bgcolor=#fefefe
| 264516 ||  || — || August 25, 2001 || Anderson Mesa || LONEOS || — || align=right | 1.4 km || 
|-id=517 bgcolor=#E9E9E9
| 264517 ||  || — || August 20, 2001 || Palomar || NEAT || BAR || align=right | 1.5 km || 
|-id=518 bgcolor=#E9E9E9
| 264518 ||  || — || August 19, 2001 || Socorro || LINEAR || — || align=right | 1.5 km || 
|-id=519 bgcolor=#FA8072
| 264519 ||  || — || August 19, 2001 || Socorro || LINEAR || — || align=right | 1.6 km || 
|-id=520 bgcolor=#fefefe
| 264520 ||  || — || September 10, 2001 || Socorro || LINEAR || H || align=right data-sort-value="0.71" | 710 m || 
|-id=521 bgcolor=#E9E9E9
| 264521 ||  || — || September 9, 2001 || Socorro || LINEAR || — || align=right | 1.1 km || 
|-id=522 bgcolor=#fefefe
| 264522 ||  || — || September 10, 2001 || Socorro || LINEAR || — || align=right | 1.1 km || 
|-id=523 bgcolor=#E9E9E9
| 264523 ||  || — || September 11, 2001 || Socorro || LINEAR || EUN || align=right | 1.9 km || 
|-id=524 bgcolor=#E9E9E9
| 264524 ||  || — || September 12, 2001 || Socorro || LINEAR || JUN || align=right data-sort-value="0.97" | 970 m || 
|-id=525 bgcolor=#E9E9E9
| 264525 ||  || — || September 12, 2001 || Socorro || LINEAR || — || align=right | 1.3 km || 
|-id=526 bgcolor=#E9E9E9
| 264526 ||  || — || September 12, 2001 || Socorro || LINEAR || — || align=right | 1.3 km || 
|-id=527 bgcolor=#E9E9E9
| 264527 ||  || — || September 12, 2001 || Socorro || LINEAR || ADE || align=right | 3.0 km || 
|-id=528 bgcolor=#fefefe
| 264528 ||  || — || September 12, 2001 || Kitt Peak || Spacewatch || — || align=right | 1.3 km || 
|-id=529 bgcolor=#E9E9E9
| 264529 ||  || — || September 12, 2001 || Socorro || LINEAR || MIS || align=right | 2.9 km || 
|-id=530 bgcolor=#fefefe
| 264530 ||  || — || September 12, 2001 || Socorro || LINEAR || MAS || align=right | 1.0 km || 
|-id=531 bgcolor=#E9E9E9
| 264531 ||  || — || September 12, 2001 || Socorro || LINEAR || — || align=right data-sort-value="0.95" | 950 m || 
|-id=532 bgcolor=#fefefe
| 264532 ||  || — || September 12, 2001 || Socorro || LINEAR || V || align=right | 1.1 km || 
|-id=533 bgcolor=#E9E9E9
| 264533 ||  || — || September 12, 2001 || Socorro || LINEAR || — || align=right | 1.1 km || 
|-id=534 bgcolor=#E9E9E9
| 264534 ||  || — || September 11, 2001 || Anderson Mesa || LONEOS || EUN || align=right | 1.4 km || 
|-id=535 bgcolor=#E9E9E9
| 264535 ||  || — || September 10, 2001 || Socorro || LINEAR || — || align=right | 1.5 km || 
|-id=536 bgcolor=#E9E9E9
| 264536 || 2001 SR || — || September 17, 2001 || Goodricke-Pigott || R. A. Tucker || MAR || align=right | 1.7 km || 
|-id=537 bgcolor=#E9E9E9
| 264537 ||  || — || September 16, 2001 || Socorro || LINEAR || — || align=right | 1.1 km || 
|-id=538 bgcolor=#fefefe
| 264538 ||  || — || September 18, 2001 || Kitt Peak || Spacewatch || — || align=right | 1.4 km || 
|-id=539 bgcolor=#E9E9E9
| 264539 ||  || — || September 16, 2001 || Socorro || LINEAR || — || align=right | 1.0 km || 
|-id=540 bgcolor=#E9E9E9
| 264540 ||  || — || September 16, 2001 || Socorro || LINEAR || KON || align=right | 3.2 km || 
|-id=541 bgcolor=#E9E9E9
| 264541 ||  || — || September 16, 2001 || Socorro || LINEAR || — || align=right | 1.2 km || 
|-id=542 bgcolor=#E9E9E9
| 264542 ||  || — || September 17, 2001 || Socorro || LINEAR || — || align=right | 1.1 km || 
|-id=543 bgcolor=#E9E9E9
| 264543 ||  || — || September 17, 2001 || Socorro || LINEAR || — || align=right | 2.0 km || 
|-id=544 bgcolor=#fefefe
| 264544 ||  || — || September 16, 2001 || Socorro || LINEAR || — || align=right | 1.5 km || 
|-id=545 bgcolor=#E9E9E9
| 264545 ||  || — || September 16, 2001 || Socorro || LINEAR || — || align=right | 1.2 km || 
|-id=546 bgcolor=#E9E9E9
| 264546 ||  || — || September 19, 2001 || Socorro || LINEAR || HEN || align=right | 1.3 km || 
|-id=547 bgcolor=#E9E9E9
| 264547 ||  || — || September 16, 2001 || Socorro || LINEAR || — || align=right | 1.3 km || 
|-id=548 bgcolor=#E9E9E9
| 264548 ||  || — || September 17, 2001 || Socorro || LINEAR || — || align=right | 1.9 km || 
|-id=549 bgcolor=#E9E9E9
| 264549 ||  || — || September 19, 2001 || Socorro || LINEAR || — || align=right | 1.2 km || 
|-id=550 bgcolor=#E9E9E9
| 264550 ||  || — || September 19, 2001 || Socorro || LINEAR || — || align=right | 1.0 km || 
|-id=551 bgcolor=#E9E9E9
| 264551 ||  || — || September 19, 2001 || Socorro || LINEAR || — || align=right | 1.3 km || 
|-id=552 bgcolor=#E9E9E9
| 264552 ||  || — || September 19, 2001 || Socorro || LINEAR || — || align=right | 1.2 km || 
|-id=553 bgcolor=#E9E9E9
| 264553 ||  || — || September 19, 2001 || Socorro || LINEAR || — || align=right | 1.3 km || 
|-id=554 bgcolor=#E9E9E9
| 264554 ||  || — || September 19, 2001 || Socorro || LINEAR || — || align=right | 1.7 km || 
|-id=555 bgcolor=#fefefe
| 264555 ||  || — || September 20, 2001 || Socorro || LINEAR || — || align=right | 1.4 km || 
|-id=556 bgcolor=#E9E9E9
| 264556 ||  || — || September 25, 2001 || Desert Eagle || W. K. Y. Yeung || — || align=right | 1.6 km || 
|-id=557 bgcolor=#E9E9E9
| 264557 ||  || — || September 20, 2001 || Socorro || LINEAR || — || align=right data-sort-value="0.98" | 980 m || 
|-id=558 bgcolor=#E9E9E9
| 264558 ||  || — || September 20, 2001 || Socorro || LINEAR || — || align=right | 1.8 km || 
|-id=559 bgcolor=#fefefe
| 264559 ||  || — || September 22, 2001 || Socorro || LINEAR || V || align=right data-sort-value="0.98" | 980 m || 
|-id=560 bgcolor=#E9E9E9
| 264560 ||  || — || September 25, 2001 || Socorro || LINEAR || JUN || align=right | 1.6 km || 
|-id=561 bgcolor=#E9E9E9
| 264561 ||  || — || September 25, 2001 || Palomar || NEAT || — || align=right | 2.7 km || 
|-id=562 bgcolor=#E9E9E9
| 264562 ||  || — || October 6, 2001 || Palomar || NEAT || MIS || align=right | 2.8 km || 
|-id=563 bgcolor=#E9E9E9
| 264563 ||  || — || October 13, 2001 || Socorro || LINEAR || — || align=right | 1.8 km || 
|-id=564 bgcolor=#E9E9E9
| 264564 ||  || — || October 11, 2001 || Socorro || LINEAR || — || align=right | 2.9 km || 
|-id=565 bgcolor=#E9E9E9
| 264565 ||  || — || October 14, 2001 || Socorro || LINEAR || — || align=right | 1.5 km || 
|-id=566 bgcolor=#E9E9E9
| 264566 ||  || — || October 14, 2001 || Socorro || LINEAR || — || align=right | 1.5 km || 
|-id=567 bgcolor=#E9E9E9
| 264567 ||  || — || October 14, 2001 || Socorro || LINEAR || — || align=right | 1.9 km || 
|-id=568 bgcolor=#E9E9E9
| 264568 ||  || — || October 14, 2001 || Socorro || LINEAR || — || align=right | 2.9 km || 
|-id=569 bgcolor=#E9E9E9
| 264569 ||  || — || October 13, 2001 || Socorro || LINEAR || — || align=right | 1.9 km || 
|-id=570 bgcolor=#E9E9E9
| 264570 ||  || — || October 13, 2001 || Socorro || LINEAR || — || align=right | 2.2 km || 
|-id=571 bgcolor=#E9E9E9
| 264571 ||  || — || October 13, 2001 || Socorro || LINEAR || — || align=right | 1.7 km || 
|-id=572 bgcolor=#E9E9E9
| 264572 ||  || — || October 13, 2001 || Socorro || LINEAR || — || align=right | 1.6 km || 
|-id=573 bgcolor=#E9E9E9
| 264573 ||  || — || October 14, 2001 || Socorro || LINEAR || — || align=right | 1.4 km || 
|-id=574 bgcolor=#E9E9E9
| 264574 ||  || — || October 14, 2001 || Socorro || LINEAR || — || align=right | 2.3 km || 
|-id=575 bgcolor=#E9E9E9
| 264575 ||  || — || October 15, 2001 || Desert Eagle || W. K. Y. Yeung || — || align=right | 1.9 km || 
|-id=576 bgcolor=#E9E9E9
| 264576 ||  || — || October 15, 2001 || Socorro || LINEAR || EUN || align=right | 1.9 km || 
|-id=577 bgcolor=#E9E9E9
| 264577 ||  || — || October 15, 2001 || Socorro || LINEAR || — || align=right | 1.5 km || 
|-id=578 bgcolor=#E9E9E9
| 264578 ||  || — || October 15, 2001 || Socorro || LINEAR || — || align=right | 2.2 km || 
|-id=579 bgcolor=#E9E9E9
| 264579 ||  || — || October 12, 2001 || Haleakala || NEAT || — || align=right | 1.6 km || 
|-id=580 bgcolor=#E9E9E9
| 264580 ||  || — || October 12, 2001 || Haleakala || NEAT || EUN || align=right | 1.7 km || 
|-id=581 bgcolor=#E9E9E9
| 264581 ||  || — || October 13, 2001 || Palomar || NEAT || — || align=right | 3.7 km || 
|-id=582 bgcolor=#d6d6d6
| 264582 ||  || — || October 13, 2001 || Palomar || NEAT || EUP || align=right | 7.0 km || 
|-id=583 bgcolor=#E9E9E9
| 264583 ||  || — || October 11, 2001 || Palomar || NEAT || — || align=right | 1.1 km || 
|-id=584 bgcolor=#E9E9E9
| 264584 ||  || — || October 11, 2001 || Palomar || NEAT || — || align=right | 1.2 km || 
|-id=585 bgcolor=#E9E9E9
| 264585 ||  || — || October 15, 2001 || Socorro || LINEAR || — || align=right | 2.1 km || 
|-id=586 bgcolor=#E9E9E9
| 264586 ||  || — || October 14, 2001 || Socorro || LINEAR || — || align=right | 1.1 km || 
|-id=587 bgcolor=#E9E9E9
| 264587 ||  || — || October 14, 2001 || Socorro || LINEAR || — || align=right | 2.2 km || 
|-id=588 bgcolor=#E9E9E9
| 264588 ||  || — || October 14, 2001 || Socorro || LINEAR || — || align=right | 1.8 km || 
|-id=589 bgcolor=#E9E9E9
| 264589 ||  || — || October 12, 2001 || Haleakala || NEAT || — || align=right | 1.9 km || 
|-id=590 bgcolor=#E9E9E9
| 264590 ||  || — || October 13, 2001 || Anderson Mesa || LONEOS || — || align=right | 1.7 km || 
|-id=591 bgcolor=#E9E9E9
| 264591 ||  || — || October 13, 2001 || Anderson Mesa || LONEOS || — || align=right | 1.6 km || 
|-id=592 bgcolor=#E9E9E9
| 264592 ||  || — || October 15, 2001 || Palomar || NEAT || — || align=right | 2.1 km || 
|-id=593 bgcolor=#E9E9E9
| 264593 ||  || — || October 8, 2001 || Palomar || NEAT || — || align=right | 2.0 km || 
|-id=594 bgcolor=#E9E9E9
| 264594 ||  || — || October 19, 2001 || Emerald Lane || L. Ball || — || align=right | 1.5 km || 
|-id=595 bgcolor=#d6d6d6
| 264595 ||  || — || October 24, 2001 || Desert Eagle || W. K. Y. Yeung || 3:2 || align=right | 6.4 km || 
|-id=596 bgcolor=#fefefe
| 264596 ||  || — || October 16, 2001 || Socorro || LINEAR || — || align=right | 1.3 km || 
|-id=597 bgcolor=#E9E9E9
| 264597 ||  || — || October 16, 2001 || Socorro || LINEAR || — || align=right | 1.2 km || 
|-id=598 bgcolor=#E9E9E9
| 264598 ||  || — || October 17, 2001 || Socorro || LINEAR || — || align=right | 2.5 km || 
|-id=599 bgcolor=#E9E9E9
| 264599 ||  || — || October 17, 2001 || Socorro || LINEAR || — || align=right | 1.0 km || 
|-id=600 bgcolor=#E9E9E9
| 264600 ||  || — || October 17, 2001 || Socorro || LINEAR || — || align=right | 1.5 km || 
|}

264601–264700 

|-bgcolor=#E9E9E9
| 264601 ||  || — || October 18, 2001 || Socorro || LINEAR || — || align=right | 2.6 km || 
|-id=602 bgcolor=#E9E9E9
| 264602 ||  || — || October 17, 2001 || Socorro || LINEAR || — || align=right | 1.7 km || 
|-id=603 bgcolor=#E9E9E9
| 264603 ||  || — || October 16, 2001 || Kitt Peak || Spacewatch || — || align=right | 1.1 km || 
|-id=604 bgcolor=#E9E9E9
| 264604 ||  || — || October 19, 2001 || Palomar || NEAT || — || align=right | 1.5 km || 
|-id=605 bgcolor=#E9E9E9
| 264605 ||  || — || October 21, 2001 || Socorro || LINEAR || — || align=right | 1.0 km || 
|-id=606 bgcolor=#E9E9E9
| 264606 ||  || — || October 21, 2001 || Socorro || LINEAR || — || align=right | 2.0 km || 
|-id=607 bgcolor=#E9E9E9
| 264607 ||  || — || October 22, 2001 || Socorro || LINEAR || MIS || align=right | 3.2 km || 
|-id=608 bgcolor=#E9E9E9
| 264608 ||  || — || October 23, 2001 || Socorro || LINEAR || — || align=right | 1.3 km || 
|-id=609 bgcolor=#E9E9E9
| 264609 ||  || — || October 21, 2001 || Socorro || LINEAR || — || align=right | 1.4 km || 
|-id=610 bgcolor=#E9E9E9
| 264610 ||  || — || October 23, 2001 || Palomar || NEAT || — || align=right | 2.6 km || 
|-id=611 bgcolor=#E9E9E9
| 264611 ||  || — || October 18, 2001 || Palomar || NEAT || — || align=right | 1.3 km || 
|-id=612 bgcolor=#E9E9E9
| 264612 ||  || — || October 18, 2001 || Palomar || NEAT || — || align=right | 1.0 km || 
|-id=613 bgcolor=#E9E9E9
| 264613 ||  || — || October 18, 2001 || Palomar || NEAT || — || align=right | 1.6 km || 
|-id=614 bgcolor=#E9E9E9
| 264614 ||  || — || October 19, 2001 || Palomar || NEAT || — || align=right | 1.4 km || 
|-id=615 bgcolor=#E9E9E9
| 264615 ||  || — || October 19, 2001 || Kitt Peak || Spacewatch || — || align=right | 1.0 km || 
|-id=616 bgcolor=#E9E9E9
| 264616 ||  || — || October 19, 2001 || Palomar || NEAT || — || align=right | 1.7 km || 
|-id=617 bgcolor=#E9E9E9
| 264617 ||  || — || October 21, 2001 || Socorro || LINEAR || — || align=right | 1.6 km || 
|-id=618 bgcolor=#E9E9E9
| 264618 ||  || — || October 21, 2001 || Socorro || LINEAR || — || align=right | 1.0 km || 
|-id=619 bgcolor=#E9E9E9
| 264619 ||  || — || November 9, 2001 || Socorro || LINEAR || — || align=right | 2.4 km || 
|-id=620 bgcolor=#E9E9E9
| 264620 ||  || — || November 9, 2001 || Socorro || LINEAR || MIS || align=right | 2.6 km || 
|-id=621 bgcolor=#E9E9E9
| 264621 ||  || — || November 9, 2001 || Socorro || LINEAR || MIS || align=right | 2.7 km || 
|-id=622 bgcolor=#E9E9E9
| 264622 ||  || — || November 10, 2001 || Socorro || LINEAR || — || align=right | 1.9 km || 
|-id=623 bgcolor=#fefefe
| 264623 ||  || — || November 10, 2001 || Socorro || LINEAR || — || align=right | 1.9 km || 
|-id=624 bgcolor=#E9E9E9
| 264624 ||  || — || November 12, 2001 || Anderson Mesa || LONEOS || EUN || align=right | 1.5 km || 
|-id=625 bgcolor=#E9E9E9
| 264625 ||  || — || November 15, 2001 || Socorro || LINEAR || — || align=right | 2.1 km || 
|-id=626 bgcolor=#E9E9E9
| 264626 ||  || — || November 15, 2001 || Socorro || LINEAR || — || align=right | 2.1 km || 
|-id=627 bgcolor=#E9E9E9
| 264627 ||  || — || November 12, 2001 || Apache Point || SDSS || — || align=right | 1.5 km || 
|-id=628 bgcolor=#E9E9E9
| 264628 ||  || — || November 17, 2001 || Socorro || LINEAR || — || align=right | 1.7 km || 
|-id=629 bgcolor=#fefefe
| 264629 ||  || — || November 17, 2001 || Socorro || LINEAR || — || align=right | 1.9 km || 
|-id=630 bgcolor=#E9E9E9
| 264630 ||  || — || November 17, 2001 || Socorro || LINEAR || HNS || align=right | 1.8 km || 
|-id=631 bgcolor=#E9E9E9
| 264631 ||  || — || November 18, 2001 || Socorro || LINEAR || — || align=right | 1.3 km || 
|-id=632 bgcolor=#E9E9E9
| 264632 ||  || — || November 18, 2001 || Kitt Peak || Spacewatch || — || align=right | 1.3 km || 
|-id=633 bgcolor=#E9E9E9
| 264633 ||  || — || November 19, 2001 || Socorro || LINEAR || MIS || align=right | 2.5 km || 
|-id=634 bgcolor=#E9E9E9
| 264634 ||  || — || November 19, 2001 || Socorro || LINEAR || — || align=right | 1.8 km || 
|-id=635 bgcolor=#E9E9E9
| 264635 ||  || — || November 19, 2001 || Socorro || LINEAR || — || align=right | 1.0 km || 
|-id=636 bgcolor=#E9E9E9
| 264636 ||  || — || November 19, 2001 || Socorro || LINEAR || — || align=right | 1.1 km || 
|-id=637 bgcolor=#E9E9E9
| 264637 ||  || — || November 19, 2001 || Socorro || LINEAR || — || align=right | 1.3 km || 
|-id=638 bgcolor=#E9E9E9
| 264638 ||  || — || November 20, 2001 || Socorro || LINEAR || MRX || align=right | 1.2 km || 
|-id=639 bgcolor=#E9E9E9
| 264639 ||  || — || November 20, 2001 || Socorro || LINEAR || — || align=right | 3.1 km || 
|-id=640 bgcolor=#E9E9E9
| 264640 ||  || — || November 20, 2001 || Socorro || LINEAR || — || align=right | 1.5 km || 
|-id=641 bgcolor=#E9E9E9
| 264641 ||  || — || November 20, 2001 || Socorro || LINEAR || — || align=right | 1.4 km || 
|-id=642 bgcolor=#E9E9E9
| 264642 ||  || — || November 20, 2001 || Socorro || LINEAR || — || align=right | 1.4 km || 
|-id=643 bgcolor=#E9E9E9
| 264643 ||  || — || November 17, 2001 || Kitt Peak || Spacewatch || — || align=right | 1.0 km || 
|-id=644 bgcolor=#E9E9E9
| 264644 ||  || — || December 9, 2001 || Socorro || LINEAR || — || align=right | 2.6 km || 
|-id=645 bgcolor=#E9E9E9
| 264645 ||  || — || December 7, 2001 || Cima Ekar || ADAS || — || align=right | 1.4 km || 
|-id=646 bgcolor=#E9E9E9
| 264646 ||  || — || December 14, 2001 || Kitt Peak || Spacewatch || JUN || align=right | 1.5 km || 
|-id=647 bgcolor=#E9E9E9
| 264647 ||  || — || December 9, 2001 || Socorro || LINEAR || — || align=right | 2.0 km || 
|-id=648 bgcolor=#E9E9E9
| 264648 ||  || — || December 9, 2001 || Socorro || LINEAR || EUN || align=right | 1.7 km || 
|-id=649 bgcolor=#E9E9E9
| 264649 ||  || — || December 9, 2001 || Socorro || LINEAR || — || align=right | 1.9 km || 
|-id=650 bgcolor=#E9E9E9
| 264650 ||  || — || December 9, 2001 || Socorro || LINEAR || CLO || align=right | 2.9 km || 
|-id=651 bgcolor=#E9E9E9
| 264651 ||  || — || December 10, 2001 || Socorro || LINEAR || MAR || align=right | 1.5 km || 
|-id=652 bgcolor=#E9E9E9
| 264652 ||  || — || December 11, 2001 || Socorro || LINEAR || — || align=right | 1.5 km || 
|-id=653 bgcolor=#E9E9E9
| 264653 ||  || — || December 10, 2001 || Socorro || LINEAR || — || align=right | 2.7 km || 
|-id=654 bgcolor=#E9E9E9
| 264654 ||  || — || December 13, 2001 || Socorro || LINEAR || — || align=right | 1.8 km || 
|-id=655 bgcolor=#E9E9E9
| 264655 ||  || — || December 10, 2001 || Socorro || LINEAR || — || align=right | 2.5 km || 
|-id=656 bgcolor=#E9E9E9
| 264656 ||  || — || December 10, 2001 || Socorro || LINEAR || — || align=right | 2.2 km || 
|-id=657 bgcolor=#E9E9E9
| 264657 ||  || — || December 10, 2001 || Socorro || LINEAR || — || align=right | 3.1 km || 
|-id=658 bgcolor=#E9E9E9
| 264658 ||  || — || December 10, 2001 || Socorro || LINEAR || — || align=right | 2.4 km || 
|-id=659 bgcolor=#E9E9E9
| 264659 ||  || — || December 10, 2001 || Socorro || LINEAR || — || align=right | 3.9 km || 
|-id=660 bgcolor=#E9E9E9
| 264660 ||  || — || December 11, 2001 || Socorro || LINEAR || JUN || align=right | 1.4 km || 
|-id=661 bgcolor=#E9E9E9
| 264661 ||  || — || December 11, 2001 || Socorro || LINEAR || — || align=right | 1.2 km || 
|-id=662 bgcolor=#E9E9E9
| 264662 ||  || — || December 13, 2001 || Socorro || LINEAR || — || align=right | 2.1 km || 
|-id=663 bgcolor=#E9E9E9
| 264663 ||  || — || December 14, 2001 || Socorro || LINEAR || — || align=right | 3.0 km || 
|-id=664 bgcolor=#E9E9E9
| 264664 ||  || — || December 14, 2001 || Socorro || LINEAR || — || align=right | 4.6 km || 
|-id=665 bgcolor=#E9E9E9
| 264665 ||  || — || December 14, 2001 || Socorro || LINEAR || — || align=right | 2.2 km || 
|-id=666 bgcolor=#E9E9E9
| 264666 ||  || — || December 14, 2001 || Socorro || LINEAR || — || align=right | 1.7 km || 
|-id=667 bgcolor=#E9E9E9
| 264667 ||  || — || December 14, 2001 || Socorro || LINEAR || — || align=right | 2.0 km || 
|-id=668 bgcolor=#E9E9E9
| 264668 ||  || — || December 14, 2001 || Socorro || LINEAR || HEN || align=right | 1.2 km || 
|-id=669 bgcolor=#fefefe
| 264669 ||  || — || December 14, 2001 || Socorro || LINEAR || — || align=right | 1.3 km || 
|-id=670 bgcolor=#E9E9E9
| 264670 ||  || — || December 14, 2001 || Socorro || LINEAR || — || align=right | 2.6 km || 
|-id=671 bgcolor=#E9E9E9
| 264671 ||  || — || December 15, 2001 || Socorro || LINEAR || — || align=right | 2.0 km || 
|-id=672 bgcolor=#E9E9E9
| 264672 ||  || — || December 15, 2001 || Socorro || LINEAR || — || align=right | 1.3 km || 
|-id=673 bgcolor=#E9E9E9
| 264673 ||  || — || December 15, 2001 || Socorro || LINEAR || — || align=right | 1.6 km || 
|-id=674 bgcolor=#E9E9E9
| 264674 ||  || — || December 15, 2001 || Socorro || LINEAR || — || align=right | 2.1 km || 
|-id=675 bgcolor=#E9E9E9
| 264675 ||  || — || December 15, 2001 || Socorro || LINEAR || — || align=right | 1.8 km || 
|-id=676 bgcolor=#E9E9E9
| 264676 ||  || — || December 5, 2001 || Haleakala || NEAT || — || align=right | 1.4 km || 
|-id=677 bgcolor=#E9E9E9
| 264677 ||  || — || December 23, 2001 || Kingsnake || J. V. McClusky || — || align=right | 2.4 km || 
|-id=678 bgcolor=#E9E9E9
| 264678 ||  || — || December 18, 2001 || Socorro || LINEAR || — || align=right | 2.3 km || 
|-id=679 bgcolor=#E9E9E9
| 264679 ||  || — || December 18, 2001 || Socorro || LINEAR || — || align=right | 2.0 km || 
|-id=680 bgcolor=#E9E9E9
| 264680 ||  || — || December 17, 2001 || Socorro || LINEAR || — || align=right | 1.6 km || 
|-id=681 bgcolor=#E9E9E9
| 264681 ||  || — || December 18, 2001 || Anderson Mesa || LONEOS || — || align=right | 2.3 km || 
|-id=682 bgcolor=#E9E9E9
| 264682 ||  || — || December 19, 2001 || Socorro || LINEAR || — || align=right | 2.1 km || 
|-id=683 bgcolor=#E9E9E9
| 264683 ||  || — || December 17, 2001 || Socorro || LINEAR || — || align=right | 2.5 km || 
|-id=684 bgcolor=#E9E9E9
| 264684 ||  || — || December 17, 2001 || Socorro || LINEAR || — || align=right | 2.8 km || 
|-id=685 bgcolor=#E9E9E9
| 264685 ||  || — || December 22, 2001 || Socorro || LINEAR || HNS || align=right | 1.8 km || 
|-id=686 bgcolor=#E9E9E9
| 264686 ||  || — || December 22, 2001 || Socorro || LINEAR || — || align=right | 2.0 km || 
|-id=687 bgcolor=#E9E9E9
| 264687 ||  || — || December 20, 2001 || Palomar || NEAT || — || align=right | 2.3 km || 
|-id=688 bgcolor=#E9E9E9
| 264688 ||  || — || January 6, 2002 || Kitt Peak || Spacewatch || MRX || align=right | 1.0 km || 
|-id=689 bgcolor=#E9E9E9
| 264689 ||  || — || January 12, 2002 || Desert Eagle || W. K. Y. Yeung || — || align=right | 3.0 km || 
|-id=690 bgcolor=#E9E9E9
| 264690 ||  || — || January 7, 2002 || Socorro || LINEAR || JUN || align=right | 1.6 km || 
|-id=691 bgcolor=#E9E9E9
| 264691 ||  || — || January 9, 2002 || Socorro || LINEAR || EUN || align=right | 1.8 km || 
|-id=692 bgcolor=#E9E9E9
| 264692 ||  || — || January 9, 2002 || Socorro || LINEAR || VIB || align=right | 2.5 km || 
|-id=693 bgcolor=#E9E9E9
| 264693 ||  || — || January 9, 2002 || Socorro || LINEAR || WIT || align=right | 1.5 km || 
|-id=694 bgcolor=#E9E9E9
| 264694 ||  || — || January 9, 2002 || Socorro || LINEAR || — || align=right | 2.5 km || 
|-id=695 bgcolor=#E9E9E9
| 264695 ||  || — || January 12, 2002 || Socorro || LINEAR || — || align=right | 1.7 km || 
|-id=696 bgcolor=#E9E9E9
| 264696 ||  || — || January 8, 2002 || Socorro || LINEAR || — || align=right | 2.6 km || 
|-id=697 bgcolor=#E9E9E9
| 264697 ||  || — || January 8, 2002 || Socorro || LINEAR || — || align=right | 2.0 km || 
|-id=698 bgcolor=#E9E9E9
| 264698 ||  || — || January 9, 2002 || Socorro || LINEAR || — || align=right | 2.6 km || 
|-id=699 bgcolor=#E9E9E9
| 264699 ||  || — || January 9, 2002 || Socorro || LINEAR || — || align=right | 2.5 km || 
|-id=700 bgcolor=#E9E9E9
| 264700 ||  || — || January 9, 2002 || Socorro || LINEAR || — || align=right | 3.2 km || 
|}

264701–264800 

|-bgcolor=#E9E9E9
| 264701 ||  || — || January 9, 2002 || Socorro || LINEAR || — || align=right | 2.5 km || 
|-id=702 bgcolor=#E9E9E9
| 264702 ||  || — || January 13, 2002 || Socorro || LINEAR || PAD || align=right | 2.2 km || 
|-id=703 bgcolor=#E9E9E9
| 264703 ||  || — || January 15, 2002 || Socorro || LINEAR || NEM || align=right | 3.2 km || 
|-id=704 bgcolor=#E9E9E9
| 264704 ||  || — || January 8, 2002 || Socorro || LINEAR || — || align=right | 2.7 km || 
|-id=705 bgcolor=#E9E9E9
| 264705 ||  || — || January 9, 2002 || Socorro || LINEAR || — || align=right | 1.9 km || 
|-id=706 bgcolor=#E9E9E9
| 264706 ||  || — || January 10, 2002 || Palomar || NEAT || — || align=right | 3.0 km || 
|-id=707 bgcolor=#E9E9E9
| 264707 ||  || — || January 13, 2002 || Kitt Peak || Spacewatch || — || align=right | 2.0 km || 
|-id=708 bgcolor=#E9E9E9
| 264708 ||  || — || January 13, 2002 || Kitt Peak || Spacewatch || HEN || align=right | 1.2 km || 
|-id=709 bgcolor=#E9E9E9
| 264709 ||  || — || January 13, 2002 || Socorro || LINEAR || — || align=right | 1.9 km || 
|-id=710 bgcolor=#E9E9E9
| 264710 ||  || — || January 13, 2002 || Kitt Peak || Spacewatch || — || align=right | 2.1 km || 
|-id=711 bgcolor=#E9E9E9
| 264711 ||  || — || January 10, 2002 || Cima Ekar || ADAS || — || align=right | 2.6 km || 
|-id=712 bgcolor=#E9E9E9
| 264712 ||  || — || January 20, 2002 || Kitt Peak || Spacewatch || — || align=right | 1.9 km || 
|-id=713 bgcolor=#E9E9E9
| 264713 ||  || — || January 19, 2002 || Anderson Mesa || LONEOS || — || align=right | 4.2 km || 
|-id=714 bgcolor=#E9E9E9
| 264714 ||  || — || January 19, 2002 || Anderson Mesa || LONEOS || — || align=right | 3.3 km || 
|-id=715 bgcolor=#E9E9E9
| 264715 ||  || — || January 20, 2002 || Anderson Mesa || LONEOS || — || align=right | 3.2 km || 
|-id=716 bgcolor=#E9E9E9
| 264716 ||  || — || January 21, 2002 || Anderson Mesa || LONEOS || EUN || align=right | 1.7 km || 
|-id=717 bgcolor=#E9E9E9
| 264717 ||  || — || February 2, 2002 || Palomar || NEAT || — || align=right | 2.4 km || 
|-id=718 bgcolor=#E9E9E9
| 264718 ||  || — || February 6, 2002 || Socorro || LINEAR || ADE || align=right | 3.9 km || 
|-id=719 bgcolor=#E9E9E9
| 264719 ||  || — || February 4, 2002 || Palomar || NEAT || — || align=right | 2.3 km || 
|-id=720 bgcolor=#E9E9E9
| 264720 ||  || — || February 6, 2002 || Socorro || LINEAR || CLO || align=right | 3.7 km || 
|-id=721 bgcolor=#E9E9E9
| 264721 ||  || — || February 7, 2002 || Socorro || LINEAR || WIT || align=right | 1.6 km || 
|-id=722 bgcolor=#E9E9E9
| 264722 ||  || — || February 7, 2002 || Socorro || LINEAR || — || align=right | 3.6 km || 
|-id=723 bgcolor=#E9E9E9
| 264723 ||  || — || February 7, 2002 || Socorro || LINEAR || — || align=right | 3.2 km || 
|-id=724 bgcolor=#E9E9E9
| 264724 ||  || — || February 7, 2002 || Socorro || LINEAR || — || align=right | 2.3 km || 
|-id=725 bgcolor=#E9E9E9
| 264725 ||  || — || February 7, 2002 || Socorro || LINEAR || HOF || align=right | 4.1 km || 
|-id=726 bgcolor=#E9E9E9
| 264726 ||  || — || February 7, 2002 || Socorro || LINEAR || AGN || align=right | 1.7 km || 
|-id=727 bgcolor=#E9E9E9
| 264727 ||  || — || February 7, 2002 || Socorro || LINEAR || HNA || align=right | 2.9 km || 
|-id=728 bgcolor=#E9E9E9
| 264728 ||  || — || February 7, 2002 || Socorro || LINEAR || — || align=right | 3.3 km || 
|-id=729 bgcolor=#E9E9E9
| 264729 ||  || — || February 7, 2002 || Socorro || LINEAR || — || align=right | 3.7 km || 
|-id=730 bgcolor=#E9E9E9
| 264730 ||  || — || February 7, 2002 || Socorro || LINEAR || — || align=right | 2.9 km || 
|-id=731 bgcolor=#E9E9E9
| 264731 ||  || — || February 7, 2002 || Socorro || LINEAR || — || align=right | 3.0 km || 
|-id=732 bgcolor=#E9E9E9
| 264732 ||  || — || February 7, 2002 || Socorro || LINEAR || — || align=right | 3.8 km || 
|-id=733 bgcolor=#E9E9E9
| 264733 ||  || — || February 8, 2002 || Socorro || LINEAR || — || align=right | 3.9 km || 
|-id=734 bgcolor=#E9E9E9
| 264734 ||  || — || February 8, 2002 || Socorro || LINEAR || GEF || align=right | 2.0 km || 
|-id=735 bgcolor=#E9E9E9
| 264735 ||  || — || February 8, 2002 || Socorro || LINEAR || — || align=right | 2.6 km || 
|-id=736 bgcolor=#E9E9E9
| 264736 ||  || — || February 8, 2002 || Socorro || LINEAR || — || align=right | 3.8 km || 
|-id=737 bgcolor=#E9E9E9
| 264737 ||  || — || February 8, 2002 || Socorro || LINEAR || — || align=right | 3.8 km || 
|-id=738 bgcolor=#E9E9E9
| 264738 ||  || — || February 8, 2002 || Socorro || LINEAR || — || align=right | 3.7 km || 
|-id=739 bgcolor=#E9E9E9
| 264739 ||  || — || February 10, 2002 || Socorro || LINEAR || — || align=right | 3.4 km || 
|-id=740 bgcolor=#E9E9E9
| 264740 ||  || — || February 10, 2002 || Socorro || LINEAR || — || align=right | 2.6 km || 
|-id=741 bgcolor=#E9E9E9
| 264741 ||  || — || February 10, 2002 || Socorro || LINEAR || — || align=right | 2.7 km || 
|-id=742 bgcolor=#E9E9E9
| 264742 ||  || — || February 10, 2002 || Socorro || LINEAR || — || align=right | 1.8 km || 
|-id=743 bgcolor=#E9E9E9
| 264743 ||  || — || February 10, 2002 || Socorro || LINEAR || — || align=right | 3.5 km || 
|-id=744 bgcolor=#E9E9E9
| 264744 ||  || — || February 10, 2002 || Socorro || LINEAR || MRX || align=right | 1.4 km || 
|-id=745 bgcolor=#E9E9E9
| 264745 ||  || — || February 10, 2002 || Socorro || LINEAR || — || align=right | 3.1 km || 
|-id=746 bgcolor=#E9E9E9
| 264746 ||  || — || February 10, 2002 || Socorro || LINEAR || — || align=right | 2.9 km || 
|-id=747 bgcolor=#E9E9E9
| 264747 ||  || — || February 10, 2002 || Socorro || LINEAR || — || align=right | 2.1 km || 
|-id=748 bgcolor=#E9E9E9
| 264748 ||  || — || February 8, 2002 || Kitt Peak || Spacewatch || — || align=right | 2.8 km || 
|-id=749 bgcolor=#E9E9E9
| 264749 ||  || — || February 13, 2002 || Socorro || LINEAR || — || align=right | 5.1 km || 
|-id=750 bgcolor=#E9E9E9
| 264750 ||  || — || February 9, 2002 || Palomar || NEAT || POS || align=right | 4.8 km || 
|-id=751 bgcolor=#E9E9E9
| 264751 ||  || — || February 6, 2002 || Palomar || NEAT || AEO || align=right | 1.2 km || 
|-id=752 bgcolor=#E9E9E9
| 264752 ||  || — || February 19, 2002 || Socorro || LINEAR || JUN || align=right | 1.6 km || 
|-id=753 bgcolor=#E9E9E9
| 264753 ||  || — || February 19, 2002 || Socorro || LINEAR || — || align=right | 2.1 km || 
|-id=754 bgcolor=#E9E9E9
| 264754 ||  || — || February 19, 2002 || Socorro || LINEAR || — || align=right | 3.3 km || 
|-id=755 bgcolor=#E9E9E9
| 264755 ||  || — || February 20, 2002 || Socorro || LINEAR || — || align=right | 3.4 km || 
|-id=756 bgcolor=#E9E9E9
| 264756 ||  || — || February 16, 2002 || Palomar || NEAT || — || align=right | 3.6 km || 
|-id=757 bgcolor=#E9E9E9
| 264757 ||  || — || March 7, 2002 || Cima Ekar || ADAS || HNA || align=right | 3.1 km || 
|-id=758 bgcolor=#fefefe
| 264758 ||  || — || March 9, 2002 || Socorro || LINEAR || — || align=right | 1.2 km || 
|-id=759 bgcolor=#E9E9E9
| 264759 ||  || — || March 10, 2002 || Kitt Peak || Spacewatch || — || align=right | 2.6 km || 
|-id=760 bgcolor=#E9E9E9
| 264760 ||  || — || March 9, 2002 || Socorro || LINEAR || — || align=right | 4.8 km || 
|-id=761 bgcolor=#E9E9E9
| 264761 ||  || — || March 13, 2002 || Socorro || LINEAR || — || align=right | 3.2 km || 
|-id=762 bgcolor=#E9E9E9
| 264762 ||  || — || March 13, 2002 || Palomar || NEAT || HOF || align=right | 3.5 km || 
|-id=763 bgcolor=#E9E9E9
| 264763 ||  || — || March 9, 2002 || Palomar || NEAT || — || align=right | 2.3 km || 
|-id=764 bgcolor=#E9E9E9
| 264764 ||  || — || March 12, 2002 || Palomar || NEAT || AGN || align=right | 1.6 km || 
|-id=765 bgcolor=#E9E9E9
| 264765 ||  || — || March 15, 2002 || Palomar || NEAT || — || align=right | 2.8 km || 
|-id=766 bgcolor=#E9E9E9
| 264766 ||  || — || March 19, 2002 || Palomar || NEAT || — || align=right | 3.4 km || 
|-id=767 bgcolor=#E9E9E9
| 264767 ||  || — || March 18, 2002 || Kitt Peak || M. W. Buie || HEN || align=right | 1.8 km || 
|-id=768 bgcolor=#E9E9E9
| 264768 ||  || — || March 19, 2002 || Socorro || LINEAR || — || align=right | 3.7 km || 
|-id=769 bgcolor=#d6d6d6
| 264769 ||  || — || March 31, 2002 || Palomar || NEAT || — || align=right | 4.6 km || 
|-id=770 bgcolor=#C2FFFF
| 264770 ||  || — || March 20, 2002 || Palomar || NEAT || L4 || align=right | 10 km || 
|-id=771 bgcolor=#E9E9E9
| 264771 ||  || — || April 15, 2002 || Kvistaberg || UDAS || — || align=right | 4.3 km || 
|-id=772 bgcolor=#E9E9E9
| 264772 ||  || — || April 9, 2002 || Kvistaberg || UDAS || INO || align=right | 1.6 km || 
|-id=773 bgcolor=#fefefe
| 264773 ||  || — || April 11, 2002 || Anderson Mesa || LONEOS || — || align=right data-sort-value="0.90" | 900 m || 
|-id=774 bgcolor=#fefefe
| 264774 ||  || — || April 12, 2002 || Socorro || LINEAR || — || align=right data-sort-value="0.82" | 820 m || 
|-id=775 bgcolor=#E9E9E9
| 264775 ||  || — || April 13, 2002 || Palomar || NEAT || — || align=right | 3.1 km || 
|-id=776 bgcolor=#d6d6d6
| 264776 ||  || — || April 14, 2002 || Socorro || LINEAR || — || align=right | 3.3 km || 
|-id=777 bgcolor=#E9E9E9
| 264777 ||  || — || April 14, 2002 || Palomar || NEAT || — || align=right | 3.8 km || 
|-id=778 bgcolor=#E9E9E9
| 264778 ||  || — || May 1, 2002 || Palomar || NEAT || — || align=right | 3.6 km || 
|-id=779 bgcolor=#E9E9E9
| 264779 ||  || — || May 7, 2002 || Socorro || LINEAR || — || align=right | 3.5 km || 
|-id=780 bgcolor=#d6d6d6
| 264780 ||  || — || May 11, 2002 || Socorro || LINEAR || — || align=right | 3.6 km || 
|-id=781 bgcolor=#fefefe
| 264781 ||  || — || May 11, 2002 || Socorro || LINEAR || FLO || align=right | 1.0 km || 
|-id=782 bgcolor=#E9E9E9
| 264782 ||  || — || May 13, 2002 || Palomar || NEAT || — || align=right | 3.8 km || 
|-id=783 bgcolor=#d6d6d6
| 264783 ||  || — || May 29, 2002 || Haleakala || NEAT || — || align=right | 6.4 km || 
|-id=784 bgcolor=#d6d6d6
| 264784 ||  || — || June 6, 2002 || Socorro || LINEAR || JLI || align=right | 5.7 km || 
|-id=785 bgcolor=#d6d6d6
| 264785 ||  || — || June 14, 2002 || Socorro || LINEAR || — || align=right | 5.4 km || 
|-id=786 bgcolor=#d6d6d6
| 264786 ||  || — || June 8, 2002 || Haleakala || NEAT || — || align=right | 5.2 km || 
|-id=787 bgcolor=#fefefe
| 264787 ||  || — || June 16, 2002 || Palomar || NEAT || — || align=right data-sort-value="0.91" | 910 m || 
|-id=788 bgcolor=#d6d6d6
| 264788 ||  || — || June 18, 2002 || Kitt Peak || Spacewatch || — || align=right | 4.9 km || 
|-id=789 bgcolor=#d6d6d6
| 264789 ||  || — || June 16, 2002 || Palomar || NEAT || EOS || align=right | 2.5 km || 
|-id=790 bgcolor=#d6d6d6
| 264790 ||  || — || July 1, 2002 || Palomar || NEAT || — || align=right | 7.2 km || 
|-id=791 bgcolor=#FA8072
| 264791 ||  || — || July 2, 2002 || Palomar || NEAT || — || align=right | 1.1 km || 
|-id=792 bgcolor=#fefefe
| 264792 ||  || — || July 4, 2002 || Palomar || NEAT || FLO || align=right data-sort-value="0.93" | 930 m || 
|-id=793 bgcolor=#fefefe
| 264793 ||  || — || July 15, 2002 || Palomar || NEAT || FLO || align=right data-sort-value="0.82" | 820 m || 
|-id=794 bgcolor=#fefefe
| 264794 ||  || — || July 13, 2002 || Haleakala || NEAT || — || align=right | 1.2 km || 
|-id=795 bgcolor=#fefefe
| 264795 ||  || — || July 14, 2002 || Palomar || S. F. Hönig || — || align=right data-sort-value="0.97" | 970 m || 
|-id=796 bgcolor=#d6d6d6
| 264796 ||  || — || July 4, 2002 || Palomar || NEAT || — || align=right | 7.2 km || 
|-id=797 bgcolor=#fefefe
| 264797 ||  || — || July 12, 2002 || Palomar || NEAT || — || align=right data-sort-value="0.72" | 720 m || 
|-id=798 bgcolor=#d6d6d6
| 264798 ||  || — || July 14, 2002 || Palomar || NEAT || THM || align=right | 2.7 km || 
|-id=799 bgcolor=#d6d6d6
| 264799 ||  || — || July 20, 2002 || Palomar || NEAT || URS || align=right | 5.5 km || 
|-id=800 bgcolor=#d6d6d6
| 264800 ||  || — || July 18, 2002 || Socorro || LINEAR || — || align=right | 4.3 km || 
|}

264801–264900 

|-bgcolor=#fefefe
| 264801 ||  || — || July 21, 2002 || Palomar || NEAT || — || align=right data-sort-value="0.91" | 910 m || 
|-id=802 bgcolor=#d6d6d6
| 264802 ||  || — || July 22, 2002 || Palomar || NEAT || — || align=right | 4.2 km || 
|-id=803 bgcolor=#fefefe
| 264803 ||  || — || July 22, 2002 || Palomar || NEAT || — || align=right data-sort-value="0.86" | 860 m || 
|-id=804 bgcolor=#d6d6d6
| 264804 ||  || — || August 4, 2002 || Reedy Creek || J. Broughton || TIR || align=right | 5.2 km || 
|-id=805 bgcolor=#d6d6d6
| 264805 ||  || — || August 4, 2002 || Palomar || NEAT || — || align=right | 6.9 km || 
|-id=806 bgcolor=#fefefe
| 264806 ||  || — || August 5, 2002 || Palomar || NEAT || — || align=right data-sort-value="0.90" | 900 m || 
|-id=807 bgcolor=#d6d6d6
| 264807 ||  || — || August 6, 2002 || Palomar || NEAT || — || align=right | 3.9 km || 
|-id=808 bgcolor=#fefefe
| 264808 ||  || — || August 6, 2002 || Palomar || NEAT || — || align=right | 1.1 km || 
|-id=809 bgcolor=#fefefe
| 264809 ||  || — || August 9, 2002 || Socorro || LINEAR || — || align=right | 1.4 km || 
|-id=810 bgcolor=#fefefe
| 264810 ||  || — || August 10, 2002 || Socorro || LINEAR || — || align=right | 1.3 km || 
|-id=811 bgcolor=#d6d6d6
| 264811 ||  || — || August 13, 2002 || Palomar || NEAT || EOS || align=right | 3.4 km || 
|-id=812 bgcolor=#fefefe
| 264812 ||  || — || August 14, 2002 || Socorro || LINEAR || FLO || align=right data-sort-value="0.72" | 720 m || 
|-id=813 bgcolor=#fefefe
| 264813 ||  || — || August 14, 2002 || Socorro || LINEAR || ERI || align=right | 2.2 km || 
|-id=814 bgcolor=#fefefe
| 264814 ||  || — || August 13, 2002 || Anderson Mesa || LONEOS || FLO || align=right data-sort-value="0.97" | 970 m || 
|-id=815 bgcolor=#fefefe
| 264815 ||  || — || August 15, 2002 || Palomar || NEAT || — || align=right data-sort-value="0.90" | 900 m || 
|-id=816 bgcolor=#fefefe
| 264816 ||  || — || August 14, 2002 || Socorro || LINEAR || — || align=right data-sort-value="0.99" | 990 m || 
|-id=817 bgcolor=#d6d6d6
| 264817 ||  || — || August 14, 2002 || Socorro || LINEAR || — || align=right | 7.7 km || 
|-id=818 bgcolor=#fefefe
| 264818 ||  || — || August 14, 2002 || Socorro || LINEAR || FLO || align=right data-sort-value="0.84" | 840 m || 
|-id=819 bgcolor=#fefefe
| 264819 ||  || — || August 15, 2002 || Palomar || NEAT || V || align=right data-sort-value="0.63" | 630 m || 
|-id=820 bgcolor=#fefefe
| 264820 ||  || — || August 6, 2002 || Palomar || NEAT || — || align=right | 1.2 km || 
|-id=821 bgcolor=#d6d6d6
| 264821 ||  || — || August 8, 2002 || Palomar || NEAT || VER || align=right | 4.7 km || 
|-id=822 bgcolor=#d6d6d6
| 264822 ||  || — || August 8, 2002 || Palomar || S. F. Hönig || — || align=right | 4.8 km || 
|-id=823 bgcolor=#d6d6d6
| 264823 ||  || — || August 8, 2002 || Palomar || S. F. Hönig || — || align=right | 3.4 km || 
|-id=824 bgcolor=#fefefe
| 264824 ||  || — || August 8, 2002 || Palomar || S. F. Hönig || MAS || align=right data-sort-value="0.97" | 970 m || 
|-id=825 bgcolor=#fefefe
| 264825 ||  || — || August 11, 2002 || Palomar || NEAT || FLO || align=right data-sort-value="0.66" | 660 m || 
|-id=826 bgcolor=#fefefe
| 264826 ||  || — || August 11, 2002 || Palomar || NEAT || NYS || align=right data-sort-value="0.69" | 690 m || 
|-id=827 bgcolor=#d6d6d6
| 264827 ||  || — || August 15, 2002 || Palomar || NEAT || — || align=right | 6.2 km || 
|-id=828 bgcolor=#d6d6d6
| 264828 ||  || — || August 8, 2002 || Palomar || NEAT || THM || align=right | 2.4 km || 
|-id=829 bgcolor=#d6d6d6
| 264829 ||  || — || August 16, 2002 || Kitt Peak || Spacewatch || — || align=right | 4.8 km || 
|-id=830 bgcolor=#fefefe
| 264830 ||  || — || August 19, 2002 || Palomar || NEAT || — || align=right data-sort-value="0.99" | 990 m || 
|-id=831 bgcolor=#fefefe
| 264831 ||  || — || August 26, 2002 || Palomar || NEAT || V || align=right data-sort-value="0.81" | 810 m || 
|-id=832 bgcolor=#fefefe
| 264832 ||  || — || August 26, 2002 || Palomar || NEAT || FLO || align=right data-sort-value="0.85" | 850 m || 
|-id=833 bgcolor=#d6d6d6
| 264833 ||  || — || August 28, 2002 || Palomar || NEAT || — || align=right | 5.5 km || 
|-id=834 bgcolor=#d6d6d6
| 264834 ||  || — || August 29, 2002 || Palomar || NEAT || — || align=right | 3.8 km || 
|-id=835 bgcolor=#fefefe
| 264835 ||  || — || August 29, 2002 || Palomar || NEAT || NYS || align=right data-sort-value="0.86" | 860 m || 
|-id=836 bgcolor=#fefefe
| 264836 ||  || — || August 18, 2002 || Palomar || S. F. Hönig || — || align=right data-sort-value="0.88" | 880 m || 
|-id=837 bgcolor=#fefefe
| 264837 ||  || — || August 27, 2002 || Palomar || R. Matson || V || align=right data-sort-value="0.85" | 850 m || 
|-id=838 bgcolor=#d6d6d6
| 264838 ||  || — || August 28, 2002 || Palomar || R. Matson || — || align=right | 4.6 km || 
|-id=839 bgcolor=#fefefe
| 264839 ||  || — || August 18, 2002 || Palomar || NEAT || — || align=right | 1.2 km || 
|-id=840 bgcolor=#d6d6d6
| 264840 ||  || — || August 18, 2002 || Palomar || NEAT || — || align=right | 4.0 km || 
|-id=841 bgcolor=#fefefe
| 264841 ||  || — || August 16, 2002 || Palomar || NEAT || — || align=right data-sort-value="0.79" | 790 m || 
|-id=842 bgcolor=#fefefe
| 264842 ||  || — || August 17, 2002 || Palomar || NEAT || — || align=right data-sort-value="0.96" | 960 m || 
|-id=843 bgcolor=#d6d6d6
| 264843 ||  || — || August 18, 2002 || Palomar || NEAT || — || align=right | 3.9 km || 
|-id=844 bgcolor=#d6d6d6
| 264844 ||  || — || August 18, 2002 || Palomar || NEAT || — || align=right | 4.8 km || 
|-id=845 bgcolor=#d6d6d6
| 264845 ||  || — || August 17, 2002 || Palomar || NEAT || — || align=right | 4.0 km || 
|-id=846 bgcolor=#d6d6d6
| 264846 ||  || — || August 27, 2002 || Palomar || NEAT || — || align=right | 4.2 km || 
|-id=847 bgcolor=#d6d6d6
| 264847 ||  || — || August 17, 2002 || Palomar || NEAT || — || align=right | 3.1 km || 
|-id=848 bgcolor=#d6d6d6
| 264848 ||  || — || August 16, 2002 || Palomar || NEAT || — || align=right | 4.3 km || 
|-id=849 bgcolor=#fefefe
| 264849 ||  || — || September 4, 2002 || Palomar || NEAT || — || align=right | 1.2 km || 
|-id=850 bgcolor=#fefefe
| 264850 ||  || — || September 4, 2002 || Anderson Mesa || LONEOS || FLO || align=right | 1.1 km || 
|-id=851 bgcolor=#d6d6d6
| 264851 ||  || — || September 5, 2002 || Socorro || LINEAR || — || align=right | 7.1 km || 
|-id=852 bgcolor=#fefefe
| 264852 ||  || — || September 5, 2002 || Socorro || LINEAR || NYS || align=right data-sort-value="0.96" | 960 m || 
|-id=853 bgcolor=#fefefe
| 264853 ||  || — || September 5, 2002 || Anderson Mesa || LONEOS || — || align=right | 1.2 km || 
|-id=854 bgcolor=#fefefe
| 264854 ||  || — || September 5, 2002 || Socorro || LINEAR || MAS || align=right data-sort-value="0.99" | 990 m || 
|-id=855 bgcolor=#fefefe
| 264855 ||  || — || September 5, 2002 || Socorro || LINEAR || V || align=right data-sort-value="0.96" | 960 m || 
|-id=856 bgcolor=#E9E9E9
| 264856 ||  || — || September 5, 2002 || Socorro || LINEAR || — || align=right | 2.3 km || 
|-id=857 bgcolor=#fefefe
| 264857 ||  || — || September 5, 2002 || Socorro || LINEAR || — || align=right | 1.1 km || 
|-id=858 bgcolor=#d6d6d6
| 264858 ||  || — || September 5, 2002 || Anderson Mesa || LONEOS || — || align=right | 5.7 km || 
|-id=859 bgcolor=#fefefe
| 264859 ||  || — || September 6, 2002 || Socorro || LINEAR || — || align=right | 1.2 km || 
|-id=860 bgcolor=#fefefe
| 264860 ||  || — || September 6, 2002 || Socorro || LINEAR || — || align=right | 1.3 km || 
|-id=861 bgcolor=#fefefe
| 264861 ||  || — || September 8, 2002 || Campo Imperatore || CINEOS || FLO || align=right data-sort-value="0.75" | 750 m || 
|-id=862 bgcolor=#d6d6d6
| 264862 ||  || — || September 11, 2002 || Palomar || NEAT || — || align=right | 6.0 km || 
|-id=863 bgcolor=#d6d6d6
| 264863 ||  || — || September 11, 2002 || Palomar || NEAT || HYG || align=right | 5.2 km || 
|-id=864 bgcolor=#fefefe
| 264864 ||  || — || September 11, 2002 || Palomar || NEAT || — || align=right | 1.1 km || 
|-id=865 bgcolor=#fefefe
| 264865 ||  || — || September 13, 2002 || Palomar || NEAT || MAS || align=right data-sort-value="0.85" | 850 m || 
|-id=866 bgcolor=#fefefe
| 264866 ||  || — || September 13, 2002 || Palomar || NEAT || — || align=right | 1.1 km || 
|-id=867 bgcolor=#d6d6d6
| 264867 ||  || — || September 12, 2002 || Palomar || NEAT || TIR || align=right | 4.5 km || 
|-id=868 bgcolor=#fefefe
| 264868 ||  || — || September 13, 2002 || Palomar || NEAT || — || align=right | 1.4 km || 
|-id=869 bgcolor=#fefefe
| 264869 ||  || — || September 14, 2002 || Palomar || NEAT || NYS || align=right | 1.1 km || 
|-id=870 bgcolor=#d6d6d6
| 264870 ||  || — || September 15, 2002 || Palomar || NEAT || TEL || align=right | 1.8 km || 
|-id=871 bgcolor=#d6d6d6
| 264871 ||  || — || September 13, 2002 || Palomar || NEAT || VER || align=right | 4.9 km || 
|-id=872 bgcolor=#d6d6d6
| 264872 ||  || — || September 14, 2002 || Palomar || NEAT || HYG || align=right | 4.1 km || 
|-id=873 bgcolor=#d6d6d6
| 264873 ||  || — || September 14, 2002 || Palomar || R. Matson || HYG || align=right | 4.0 km || 
|-id=874 bgcolor=#d6d6d6
| 264874 ||  || — || September 14, 2002 || Palomar || R. Matson || — || align=right | 4.1 km || 
|-id=875 bgcolor=#d6d6d6
| 264875 ||  || — || September 11, 2002 || Haleakala || NEAT || — || align=right | 4.1 km || 
|-id=876 bgcolor=#fefefe
| 264876 ||  || — || September 15, 2002 || Palomar || NEAT || — || align=right data-sort-value="0.86" | 860 m || 
|-id=877 bgcolor=#d6d6d6
| 264877 ||  || — || September 15, 2002 || Palomar || NEAT || HYG || align=right | 3.6 km || 
|-id=878 bgcolor=#d6d6d6
| 264878 ||  || — || September 4, 2002 || Palomar || NEAT || — || align=right | 4.5 km || 
|-id=879 bgcolor=#d6d6d6
| 264879 ||  || — || September 4, 2002 || Palomar || NEAT || — || align=right | 4.5 km || 
|-id=880 bgcolor=#fefefe
| 264880 ||  || — || September 14, 2002 || Palomar || NEAT || — || align=right data-sort-value="0.95" | 950 m || 
|-id=881 bgcolor=#fefefe
| 264881 ||  || — || September 29, 2002 || Haleakala || NEAT || NYS || align=right data-sort-value="0.82" | 820 m || 
|-id=882 bgcolor=#fefefe
| 264882 ||  || — || September 30, 2002 || Socorro || LINEAR || — || align=right data-sort-value="0.91" | 910 m || 
|-id=883 bgcolor=#fefefe
| 264883 ||  || — || September 30, 2002 || Socorro || LINEAR || NYS || align=right data-sort-value="0.97" | 970 m || 
|-id=884 bgcolor=#fefefe
| 264884 ||  || — || September 30, 2002 || Socorro || LINEAR || — || align=right data-sort-value="0.92" | 920 m || 
|-id=885 bgcolor=#fefefe
| 264885 ||  || — || September 30, 2002 || Socorro || LINEAR || V || align=right data-sort-value="0.92" | 920 m || 
|-id=886 bgcolor=#fefefe
| 264886 ||  || — || September 30, 2002 || Haleakala || NEAT || — || align=right | 1.1 km || 
|-id=887 bgcolor=#d6d6d6
| 264887 ||  || — || September 16, 2002 || Haleakala || NEAT || — || align=right | 5.2 km || 
|-id=888 bgcolor=#fefefe
| 264888 ||  || — || September 16, 2002 || Palomar || NEAT || — || align=right | 1.1 km || 
|-id=889 bgcolor=#fefefe
| 264889 ||  || — || September 16, 2002 || Palomar || R. Matson || FLO || align=right data-sort-value="0.68" | 680 m || 
|-id=890 bgcolor=#fefefe
| 264890 ||  || — || October 1, 2002 || Socorro || LINEAR || — || align=right | 1.3 km || 
|-id=891 bgcolor=#fefefe
| 264891 ||  || — || October 1, 2002 || Anderson Mesa || LONEOS || ERI || align=right | 3.2 km || 
|-id=892 bgcolor=#fefefe
| 264892 ||  || — || October 1, 2002 || Anderson Mesa || LONEOS || NYS || align=right data-sort-value="0.92" | 920 m || 
|-id=893 bgcolor=#fefefe
| 264893 ||  || — || October 1, 2002 || Socorro || LINEAR || MAS || align=right | 1.0 km || 
|-id=894 bgcolor=#fefefe
| 264894 ||  || — || October 2, 2002 || Socorro || LINEAR || — || align=right | 1.1 km || 
|-id=895 bgcolor=#fefefe
| 264895 ||  || — || October 2, 2002 || Socorro || LINEAR || — || align=right | 1.1 km || 
|-id=896 bgcolor=#fefefe
| 264896 ||  || — || October 2, 2002 || Socorro || LINEAR || — || align=right | 1.3 km || 
|-id=897 bgcolor=#fefefe
| 264897 ||  || — || October 2, 2002 || Haleakala || NEAT || — || align=right data-sort-value="0.99" | 990 m || 
|-id=898 bgcolor=#fefefe
| 264898 ||  || — || October 2, 2002 || Socorro || LINEAR || V || align=right | 1.1 km || 
|-id=899 bgcolor=#fefefe
| 264899 ||  || — || October 3, 2002 || Socorro || LINEAR || — || align=right | 1.0 km || 
|-id=900 bgcolor=#fefefe
| 264900 ||  || — || October 4, 2002 || Palomar || NEAT || FLO || align=right data-sort-value="0.94" | 940 m || 
|}

264901–265000 

|-bgcolor=#fefefe
| 264901 ||  || — || October 3, 2002 || Socorro || LINEAR || NYS || align=right data-sort-value="0.74" | 740 m || 
|-id=902 bgcolor=#fefefe
| 264902 ||  || — || October 3, 2002 || Palomar || NEAT || ERI || align=right | 1.9 km || 
|-id=903 bgcolor=#fefefe
| 264903 ||  || — || October 3, 2002 || Palomar || NEAT || V || align=right | 1.3 km || 
|-id=904 bgcolor=#fefefe
| 264904 ||  || — || October 3, 2002 || Palomar || NEAT || V || align=right data-sort-value="0.97" | 970 m || 
|-id=905 bgcolor=#fefefe
| 264905 ||  || — || October 3, 2002 || Kitt Peak || Spacewatch || MAS || align=right data-sort-value="0.92" | 920 m || 
|-id=906 bgcolor=#d6d6d6
| 264906 ||  || — || October 3, 2002 || Palomar || NEAT || SYL7:4 || align=right | 5.7 km || 
|-id=907 bgcolor=#fefefe
| 264907 ||  || — || October 4, 2002 || Socorro || LINEAR || — || align=right | 1.3 km || 
|-id=908 bgcolor=#fefefe
| 264908 ||  || — || October 4, 2002 || Palomar || NEAT || — || align=right | 1.2 km || 
|-id=909 bgcolor=#d6d6d6
| 264909 ||  || — || April 9, 1999 || Kitt Peak || Spacewatch || 7:4 || align=right | 4.9 km || 
|-id=910 bgcolor=#E9E9E9
| 264910 ||  || — || October 4, 2002 || Socorro || LINEAR || — || align=right | 1.3 km || 
|-id=911 bgcolor=#fefefe
| 264911 ||  || — || October 3, 2002 || Socorro || LINEAR || NYS || align=right | 1.2 km || 
|-id=912 bgcolor=#fefefe
| 264912 ||  || — || October 3, 2002 || Campo Imperatore || CINEOS || — || align=right | 1.1 km || 
|-id=913 bgcolor=#fefefe
| 264913 ||  || — || October 5, 2002 || Socorro || LINEAR || — || align=right | 1.2 km || 
|-id=914 bgcolor=#E9E9E9
| 264914 ||  || — || October 6, 2002 || Socorro || LINEAR || EUN || align=right | 1.8 km || 
|-id=915 bgcolor=#fefefe
| 264915 ||  || — || October 9, 2002 || Socorro || LINEAR || — || align=right | 1.5 km || 
|-id=916 bgcolor=#fefefe
| 264916 ||  || — || October 9, 2002 || Socorro || LINEAR || — || align=right | 1.1 km || 
|-id=917 bgcolor=#fefefe
| 264917 ||  || — || October 9, 2002 || Socorro || LINEAR || — || align=right | 1.2 km || 
|-id=918 bgcolor=#fefefe
| 264918 ||  || — || October 10, 2002 || Socorro || LINEAR || — || align=right | 1.6 km || 
|-id=919 bgcolor=#fefefe
| 264919 ||  || — || October 10, 2002 || Socorro || LINEAR || V || align=right | 1.2 km || 
|-id=920 bgcolor=#fefefe
| 264920 ||  || — || October 12, 2002 || Socorro || LINEAR || FLO || align=right | 1.0 km || 
|-id=921 bgcolor=#fefefe
| 264921 ||  || — || October 4, 2002 || Apache Point || SDSS || — || align=right | 1.2 km || 
|-id=922 bgcolor=#fefefe
| 264922 ||  || — || October 5, 2002 || Apache Point || SDSS || — || align=right data-sort-value="0.91" | 910 m || 
|-id=923 bgcolor=#fefefe
| 264923 ||  || — || October 5, 2002 || Apache Point || SDSS || — || align=right data-sort-value="0.75" | 750 m || 
|-id=924 bgcolor=#fefefe
| 264924 ||  || — || October 10, 2002 || Apache Point || SDSS || — || align=right data-sort-value="0.88" | 880 m || 
|-id=925 bgcolor=#fefefe
| 264925 ||  || — || October 28, 2002 || Socorro || LINEAR || H || align=right | 1.1 km || 
|-id=926 bgcolor=#fefefe
| 264926 ||  || — || October 30, 2002 || Palomar || NEAT || — || align=right | 1.4 km || 
|-id=927 bgcolor=#E9E9E9
| 264927 ||  || — || October 31, 2002 || Anderson Mesa || LONEOS || — || align=right | 1.2 km || 
|-id=928 bgcolor=#fefefe
| 264928 ||  || — || October 31, 2002 || Palomar || NEAT || — || align=right data-sort-value="0.96" | 960 m || 
|-id=929 bgcolor=#fefefe
| 264929 ||  || — || October 31, 2002 || Palomar || NEAT || — || align=right | 1.2 km || 
|-id=930 bgcolor=#fefefe
| 264930 ||  || — || October 31, 2002 || Socorro || LINEAR || — || align=right | 1.4 km || 
|-id=931 bgcolor=#fefefe
| 264931 ||  || — || November 4, 2002 || Anderson Mesa || LONEOS || NYS || align=right | 1.00 km || 
|-id=932 bgcolor=#FA8072
| 264932 ||  || — || November 5, 2002 || Socorro || LINEAR || — || align=right | 1.8 km || 
|-id=933 bgcolor=#fefefe
| 264933 ||  || — || November 5, 2002 || Socorro || LINEAR || NYS || align=right data-sort-value="0.82" | 820 m || 
|-id=934 bgcolor=#E9E9E9
| 264934 ||  || — || November 5, 2002 || Socorro || LINEAR || HNS || align=right | 1.5 km || 
|-id=935 bgcolor=#E9E9E9
| 264935 ||  || — || November 1, 2002 || Palomar || NEAT || — || align=right | 1.6 km || 
|-id=936 bgcolor=#fefefe
| 264936 ||  || — || November 5, 2002 || Palomar || NEAT || MAS || align=right data-sort-value="0.96" | 960 m || 
|-id=937 bgcolor=#fefefe
| 264937 ||  || — || November 5, 2002 || Socorro || LINEAR || V || align=right data-sort-value="0.96" | 960 m || 
|-id=938 bgcolor=#fefefe
| 264938 ||  || — || November 7, 2002 || Socorro || LINEAR || NYS || align=right data-sort-value="0.96" | 960 m || 
|-id=939 bgcolor=#fefefe
| 264939 ||  || — || November 11, 2002 || Anderson Mesa || LONEOS || — || align=right | 1.0 km || 
|-id=940 bgcolor=#fefefe
| 264940 ||  || — || November 12, 2002 || Socorro || LINEAR || — || align=right | 1.5 km || 
|-id=941 bgcolor=#fefefe
| 264941 ||  || — || November 12, 2002 || Socorro || LINEAR || — || align=right | 1.3 km || 
|-id=942 bgcolor=#fefefe
| 264942 ||  || — || November 13, 2002 || Palomar || NEAT || EUT || align=right data-sort-value="0.97" | 970 m || 
|-id=943 bgcolor=#fefefe
| 264943 ||  || — || November 13, 2002 || Palomar || NEAT || V || align=right data-sort-value="0.91" | 910 m || 
|-id=944 bgcolor=#d6d6d6
| 264944 ||  || — || November 11, 2002 || Socorro || LINEAR || EOS || align=right | 3.1 km || 
|-id=945 bgcolor=#fefefe
| 264945 ||  || — || November 11, 2002 || Goodricke-Pigott || R. A. Tucker || — || align=right | 1.5 km || 
|-id=946 bgcolor=#E9E9E9
| 264946 ||  || — || November 14, 2002 || Socorro || LINEAR || — || align=right | 1.2 km || 
|-id=947 bgcolor=#E9E9E9
| 264947 ||  || — || November 5, 2002 || Nyukasa || Mount Nyukasa Stn. || — || align=right | 1.4 km || 
|-id=948 bgcolor=#E9E9E9
| 264948 ||  || — || November 7, 2002 || Apache Point || SDSS || — || align=right | 3.4 km || 
|-id=949 bgcolor=#E9E9E9
| 264949 ||  || — || November 24, 2002 || Palomar || NEAT || RAF || align=right | 1.7 km || 
|-id=950 bgcolor=#fefefe
| 264950 ||  || — || November 28, 2002 || Anderson Mesa || LONEOS || — || align=right | 1.6 km || 
|-id=951 bgcolor=#fefefe
| 264951 ||  || — || November 24, 2002 || Palomar || NEAT || — || align=right data-sort-value="0.97" | 970 m || 
|-id=952 bgcolor=#fefefe
| 264952 ||  || — || December 2, 2002 || Socorro || LINEAR || MAS || align=right | 1.4 km || 
|-id=953 bgcolor=#fefefe
| 264953 ||  || — || December 5, 2002 || Socorro || LINEAR || MAS || align=right data-sort-value="0.93" | 930 m || 
|-id=954 bgcolor=#fefefe
| 264954 ||  || — || December 3, 2002 || Palomar || NEAT || NYS || align=right data-sort-value="0.97" | 970 m || 
|-id=955 bgcolor=#fefefe
| 264955 ||  || — || December 5, 2002 || Socorro || LINEAR || — || align=right | 1.2 km || 
|-id=956 bgcolor=#fefefe
| 264956 ||  || — || December 5, 2002 || Kitt Peak || Spacewatch || — || align=right data-sort-value="0.83" | 830 m || 
|-id=957 bgcolor=#fefefe
| 264957 ||  || — || December 5, 2002 || Socorro || LINEAR || — || align=right | 1.2 km || 
|-id=958 bgcolor=#fefefe
| 264958 ||  || — || December 10, 2002 || Socorro || LINEAR || — || align=right | 1.4 km || 
|-id=959 bgcolor=#fefefe
| 264959 ||  || — || December 10, 2002 || Socorro || LINEAR || NYS || align=right | 1.2 km || 
|-id=960 bgcolor=#fefefe
| 264960 ||  || — || December 10, 2002 || Socorro || LINEAR || — || align=right | 1.4 km || 
|-id=961 bgcolor=#fefefe
| 264961 ||  || — || December 10, 2002 || Palomar || NEAT || NYS || align=right data-sort-value="0.92" | 920 m || 
|-id=962 bgcolor=#fefefe
| 264962 ||  || — || December 10, 2002 || Palomar || NEAT || — || align=right | 1.2 km || 
|-id=963 bgcolor=#E9E9E9
| 264963 ||  || — || December 10, 2002 || Palomar || NEAT || — || align=right data-sort-value="0.95" | 950 m || 
|-id=964 bgcolor=#fefefe
| 264964 ||  || — || December 27, 2002 || Socorro || LINEAR || H || align=right data-sort-value="0.84" | 840 m || 
|-id=965 bgcolor=#fefefe
| 264965 ||  || — || December 30, 2002 || Socorro || LINEAR || — || align=right | 1.9 km || 
|-id=966 bgcolor=#fefefe
| 264966 ||  || — || January 1, 2003 || Socorro || LINEAR || H || align=right data-sort-value="0.82" | 820 m || 
|-id=967 bgcolor=#fefefe
| 264967 ||  || — || January 5, 2003 || Socorro || LINEAR || H || align=right data-sort-value="0.76" | 760 m || 
|-id=968 bgcolor=#E9E9E9
| 264968 ||  || — || January 7, 2003 || Socorro || LINEAR || — || align=right | 1.7 km || 
|-id=969 bgcolor=#fefefe
| 264969 ||  || — || January 5, 2003 || Socorro || LINEAR || H || align=right | 1.4 km || 
|-id=970 bgcolor=#fefefe
| 264970 ||  || — || January 11, 2003 || Socorro || LINEAR || H || align=right | 1.2 km || 
|-id=971 bgcolor=#fefefe
| 264971 ||  || — || January 10, 2003 || Socorro || LINEAR || H || align=right data-sort-value="0.89" | 890 m || 
|-id=972 bgcolor=#fefefe
| 264972 ||  || — || January 25, 2003 || Socorro || LINEAR || H || align=right data-sort-value="0.98" | 980 m || 
|-id=973 bgcolor=#E9E9E9
| 264973 ||  || — || January 27, 2003 || Socorro || LINEAR || — || align=right | 1.2 km || 
|-id=974 bgcolor=#fefefe
| 264974 ||  || — || January 26, 2003 || Haleakala || NEAT || — || align=right | 1.3 km || 
|-id=975 bgcolor=#E9E9E9
| 264975 ||  || — || January 27, 2003 || Socorro || LINEAR || — || align=right | 1.6 km || 
|-id=976 bgcolor=#fefefe
| 264976 ||  || — || January 28, 2003 || Socorro || LINEAR || H || align=right | 1.1 km || 
|-id=977 bgcolor=#E9E9E9
| 264977 ||  || — || January 29, 2003 || Palomar || NEAT || — || align=right | 1.7 km || 
|-id=978 bgcolor=#fefefe
| 264978 ||  || — || January 26, 2003 || Haleakala || NEAT || H || align=right | 1.2 km || 
|-id=979 bgcolor=#fefefe
| 264979 ||  || — || January 27, 2003 || Anderson Mesa || LONEOS || H || align=right | 1.1 km || 
|-id=980 bgcolor=#E9E9E9
| 264980 ||  || — || January 30, 2003 || Haleakala || NEAT || — || align=right | 1.2 km || 
|-id=981 bgcolor=#fefefe
| 264981 ||  || — || January 31, 2003 || Kitt Peak || Spacewatch || H || align=right data-sort-value="0.83" | 830 m || 
|-id=982 bgcolor=#E9E9E9
| 264982 ||  || — || January 31, 2003 || Anderson Mesa || LONEOS || — || align=right | 1.4 km || 
|-id=983 bgcolor=#E9E9E9
| 264983 ||  || — || January 31, 2003 || Anderson Mesa || LONEOS || — || align=right | 2.0 km || 
|-id=984 bgcolor=#E9E9E9
| 264984 ||  || — || January 27, 2003 || Socorro || LINEAR || — || align=right | 2.0 km || 
|-id=985 bgcolor=#E9E9E9
| 264985 ||  || — || February 1, 2003 || Socorro || LINEAR || — || align=right | 1.5 km || 
|-id=986 bgcolor=#fefefe
| 264986 ||  || — || February 4, 2003 || Anderson Mesa || LONEOS || H || align=right data-sort-value="0.98" | 980 m || 
|-id=987 bgcolor=#fefefe
| 264987 ||  || — || February 7, 2003 || Palomar || NEAT || H || align=right data-sort-value="0.89" | 890 m || 
|-id=988 bgcolor=#E9E9E9
| 264988 ||  || — || February 12, 2003 || Haleakala || NEAT || — || align=right | 1.7 km || 
|-id=989 bgcolor=#E9E9E9
| 264989 ||  || — || February 21, 2003 || Palomar || NEAT || — || align=right | 1.2 km || 
|-id=990 bgcolor=#d6d6d6
| 264990 ||  || — || February 22, 2003 || Kleť || Kleť Obs. || 3:2 || align=right | 6.4 km || 
|-id=991 bgcolor=#E9E9E9
| 264991 ||  || — || February 24, 2003 || Campo Imperatore || CINEOS || — || align=right | 2.0 km || 
|-id=992 bgcolor=#E9E9E9
| 264992 ||  || — || February 24, 2003 || Campo Imperatore || CINEOS || — || align=right | 1.3 km || 
|-id=993 bgcolor=#FFC2E0
| 264993 ||  || — || February 26, 2003 || Socorro || LINEAR || APOPHA || align=right data-sort-value="0.31" | 310 m || 
|-id=994 bgcolor=#E9E9E9
| 264994 ||  || — || February 21, 2003 || Palomar || NEAT || — || align=right | 1.2 km || 
|-id=995 bgcolor=#E9E9E9
| 264995 ||  || — || February 22, 2003 || Palomar || NEAT || — || align=right | 1.9 km || 
|-id=996 bgcolor=#fefefe
| 264996 ||  || — || March 5, 2003 || Socorro || LINEAR || H || align=right data-sort-value="0.82" | 820 m || 
|-id=997 bgcolor=#fefefe
| 264997 ||  || — || March 5, 2003 || Socorro || LINEAR || H || align=right data-sort-value="0.79" | 790 m || 
|-id=998 bgcolor=#E9E9E9
| 264998 ||  || — || March 6, 2003 || Socorro || LINEAR || MAR || align=right | 1.6 km || 
|-id=999 bgcolor=#fefefe
| 264999 ||  || — || March 6, 2003 || Palomar || NEAT || H || align=right data-sort-value="0.75" | 750 m || 
|-id=000 bgcolor=#E9E9E9
| 265000 ||  || — || March 7, 2003 || Anderson Mesa || LONEOS || — || align=right | 1.2 km || 
|}

References

External links 
 Discovery Circumstances: Numbered Minor Planets (260001)–(265000) (IAU Minor Planet Center)

0264